= How Firm a Foundation (novel) =

Novel by David Weber

- Cover of first printing hardcover.
- Author: David Weber
- Cover artist: Stephen Youll
- Language: English
- Genre: Science fiction
- Publisher: Tor Books
- Publication date: September 13, 2011
- Publication place: United States
- Media type: Hardcover; Audiobook; Ebook
- Pages: 608
- ISBN: 978-0-7653-2154-1
- OCLC: 704383872
- Dewey Decimal: 813/.54
- LC Class: PS3573.E217 H75 2011
- Preceded by: A Mighty Fortress
- Followed by: Midst Toil and Tribulation

How Firm a Foundation is a science fiction novel by American writer David Weber. The fifth book in the Safehold series, it was published by Tor Books on September 13, 2011. The novel debuted at #8 on the New York Times hardcover fiction best seller list. The title of the novel comes from the hymn of the same name.

== Plot summary ==
Empress Sharleyen travels to Zebediah and then Corisande to stand over the trials of those accused of treason after the conspiracies of the last novel. Her firmness, fairness and judicious exercise of mercy continue to win over the hearts and minds of the newest subjects of the Empire of Charis, especially when she is undeterred after an attempted assassination that is thwarted by Merlin.

For his part, Merlin has been experimenting with steam technology, and gets no response from the orbital platforms. In Charis, technological developments are still developing water power, using deep reservoirs to control the flow of water, and also by replacing water wheels with turbines. On the artillery front, the Charisians have developed angle guns that allow them to shoot over walls, and are working on more breech-loading devices. Merlin takes these advances a little further and has Owl construct him a pair of revolvers.

Father Paityr Wylsynn has some doubts about all these developments until he is inducted into the secrets of the Brethren of Saint Zherneau. After this, he reveals to the inner circle that his family was trusted with a message from the archangels. The message implies that the archangels themselves are sleeping under the temple, and will return after 1000 years (20 years in the future at this time). Merlin is uncertain whether it is the actual archangels, or perhaps PICA versions of them. As a precaution, he begins looking at ways he can continue his own awareness in case his own PICA form is lost and finally decides to make an electronic copy of his consciousness and a VR unit to house it in.

The situation in Siddarmark is becoming strained. Siddarkmark and Silkiah are continuing trade with Charis in spite of embargoes imposed by the Church of God Awaiting, and there are large Charisian expatriate communities in these areas. Grand Inquisitor Clyntahn stokes resentment of the Charisians in the Siddarmarkian population, finally inciting them to mob violence. His nemesis Anzhelique, now known as Aivah Pahrsahn, has secretly bought up thousands of rifled muskets and trained a militia to use them, which she calls on to protect the Charisian Quarter and to keep the government of Siddarmark from falling.

Grand Inquisitor Zhaspyr Clyntahn convinces the other members of the Council of Four that the Charisians taken as prisoners of war by Admiral Thirsk at a previous engagement should be brought to the temple to suffer the Punishment of Schuller for their "heresy". Thirsk is against this, but can do nothing to stop it, so the prisoners are all taken to the temple and put to the Question and finally horrifically executed, leading to outrage in Charis and to the decree that any Inquisitor under Clyntahn's command will be shot on sight without trial.

Clyntahn also begins working differently inside of Charis, keeping his agents from contacting one another or attempting to recruit, which makes it impossible for Merlin's SNARCs to find them. They manage to steal some gunpowder and distribute it. By loading it onto wagons and driving them into major centers, they manage to kill thousands of people, and assassinate several targets. Earl Grey Harbour is killed, as well as Prince Nahrman of Emerald. Baron Green Mountain of Chisholm is badly injured.

Princess Irys and Prince Daivyn of Corisande are in Delferahk under the protection of King Zhames, and the guardianship of the Earl of Coris, their father's most trusted advisor. Coris receives orders from Clyntahn to allow the assassination of prince Daivyn so that it can be blamed on Charisians, but he has no intention to comply. He contacts the Earl Grey Harbour (before his death) and asks for asylum. The assassins arrive sooner than anticipated, but Irys and Daivyn manage to escape with the help of Merlin who manages the extricate them from the palace and lead them cross country to a rendezvous point, where Hektor Aplyn-Ahrmahk, Caleb's adopted son, manages to save them from an ambush and get them to the task force waiting for them.

== Reception ==
The book was reviewed by Daniel Ostrowski for the Polish fanzine Fahrenheit, Luiza Dobrzyńska for Paradoks, and by Bartosz Szczyżański for Poltergeist.

== Editions ==
The book was translated to several languages, including German and Polish.

=== Audiobook ===
Charles Keating narrates the audiobook version of How Firm a Foundation. Actor Oliver Wyman narrated the first two Safehold books (Off Armageddon Reef and By Schism Rent Asunder), and Jason Culp narrated the third and fourth books (By Heresies Distressed and A Mighty Fortress).

Publisher: Macmillan Audio; Unabridged edition (September 13, 2011); ISBN 1-4272-1239-2
