= By Schism Rent Asunder =

2008 novel by David Weber

- Author: David Weber
- Cover artist: Stephen Youll
- Language: English
- Genre: Science fiction
- Publisher: Tor Books
- Publication date: July 2008
- Publication place: United States
- Media type: Print (hardback)
- Pages: 512
- ISBN: 978-0-7653-1501-4
- OCLC: 184823014
- Dewey Decimal: 813/.54 22
- LC Class: PS3573.E217 B9 2008
- Preceded by: Off Armageddon Reef
- Followed by: By Heresies Distressed

By Schism Rent Asunder is a science fiction book by American writer David Weber. It is the second book in the open-ended Safehold series, after Off Armageddon Reef. The publication date was July 22, 2008. The third book in the series is named By Heresies Distressed

== Plot summary ==
Over the course of several months, Nimue Alban, known as Merlin Athrawes, has steered the Kingdom of Charis toward confrontation with Safehold's all-powerful Church of God Awaiting. The combined duties of being the guardian and adviser of King Cayleb of Charis, as well as the inspiration of Charis' burgeoning innovation, are tiring for even an android. Her only escape is space, somewhere nobody else on Safehold can follow her. She remains concerned about the kinetic bombardment platform that "Archangel" Eric Langhorne used to kill her mentor Pei Shan-Wei, and most of her supporters.

Planetside, the Kingdom of Charis has been emboldened by its devastating naval victory over the forces sent to destroy it by the Church. Archbishop Mikael Staynair of Charis, who has become the effective Martin Luther of Safehold, declares a schism between the Church of God Awaiting and his see on Charis, accusing the Group of Four, the prelates who control the Church, of being responsible for the sneak attack on Charis. King Cayleb, who has ascended to the throne following his father's death in the attack, is locked in a desperate struggle with the Church. Charis shuts down international maritime trade with well-armed privateers.

Meanwhile, the Group of Four set plans into motion to build a force capable of challenging Charis, and in the meantime to attack the Kingdom in any way possible. They order the brutal public execution of the previous Archbishop of Charis, Erayk Dynnys, but Dynnys bravely denounces them before his death. They also declare that Cayleb and Staynair are apostates and enemies of God, which creates domestic problems for Cayleb. Merlin barely manages to prevent the assassination of Staynair at the hands of Charisian church loyalists, who also destroy the Royal College. The Group of Four urge all of the nations loyal to the Church to close their ports to Charisian shipping in an attempt to attack Charis via economic means. In Ferayd, Kingdom of Delferahk, the Church's Office of Inquisition is resisted by Charisian merchants as it attempts to seize docked vessels. The ensuing massacre by the Inquisition pushes Safehold to the brink of Holy War. A Charisian fleet later raids the city in retaliation, burning much of it to the ground after allowing an evacuation.

One day, during a private meeting with Merlin, Staynair reveals himself to be part of a secret order which has uncovered irrefutable proof of humanity's true history. It is revealed that King Haarahld was a member of this group, as were most of his ancestors, and that he had made it his goal to model Charisian society on the principles of the past, and eventually reveal the truth to the world. The decision is made to inform Cayleb of the truth, as Haarahld had died before he could do so. The members of the Order agree to keep the number of people who are aware of the truth as low as possible.

Cayleb forms the Empire of Charis with Queen Sharleyan of Chisholm after arranging a political marriage to secure alliances for the long war ahead. The two end up falling in love, and agree to rule the empire jointly. Cayleb also reaches out to his father's archenemy, Prince Nahrmahn of Emerald, incorporating him into his government and arranging another marriage to seal the deal. Cayleb knows another of his father's enemies, Prince Hektor Daykyn, will refuse to submit without a fight. He sets sail with an invasion force to conquer the League of Corisande, leaving Sharleyan to govern in his stead.

== Reception ==
The book was nominated for the 2009 Prometheus Award.

Donald Jacob Uitvlugt reviewed the first two books in the series for Ray Gun Revival in January 2009, writing that "The concept of this series is a very clever one" as it allows the author to "play with the best fantasy tropes in an SFnal world", creating "an almost perfect blend of science fiction and fantasy". Uitvlugt also praised Weber for creating "well developed characters" and an "epic series" that he compared to "George R.R. Martin’s Song of Ice and Fire without the relentless, depressing plot".

In Poland, in 2011 the book was reviewed for Poltergeist by Bartosz Szczyżański and in 2012 for Fahrenheit by Daniel Ostrowski.

== Editions ==
The book was translated to several languages, including French, German and Polish.

=== Audiobook (Book on CD) ===
- The reader of the Audiobook version of both Off Armageddon Reef and By Schism Rent Asunder was Oliver Wyman.

(The reader was switched to Jason Culp for both By Heresies Distressed and A Mighty Fortress.)
