= By Heresies Distressed =

Novel by David Weber

- Cover
- Author: David Weber
- Cover artist: Stephen Youll
- Language: English
- Genre: Science fiction
- Publisher: Tor Books
- Publication date: July 7, 2009
- Publication place: United States
- Media type: Print (hardback)
- Pages: 608
- ISBN: 0-7653-1503-3
- OCLC: 290437083
- Dewey Decimal: 813/.54 22
- LC Class: PS3573.E217 B89 2009
- Preceded by: By Schism Rent Asunder
- Followed by: A Mighty Fortress

By Heresies Distressed is a science fiction novel by American writer David Weber, published by Tor Books. It is the third book in the Safehold series. It debuted at number 11 on the July 17, 2009, New York Times best-selling hardcover fiction list, number 25 on the July 24, 2009, list, and number 30 on the July 30, 2009, list.

By Heresies Distressed picks up exactly at the end of Book 2. Together, Books 2 and 3 cover only 15 months, a much shorter period than book 1.

== Synopsis ==
The Imperial Charisian Navy, having overpowered the defenders of Ferayd, Kingdom of Delferahk, has captured the ringleaders of a massacre of Charisian merchantmen and their families. The captives include priests of the Inquisition of the Church of God Awaiting. Ferayd's waterfront district is burned to the ground, with residents allowed to salvage only what they can carry, before clergy of Mother Church are hanged by secular powers for the first time in known history. Irrefutable proof the Inquisition orchestrated and celebrated the murder of innocents is published worldwide.

Mercantile and political leaders gather in seclusion in the Republic of Siddarmark to contemplate recent events: The Charisians have unilaterally thrown off the Church's oppressive yoke and destroyed every force sent against them. The Kingdom of Chisholm has aligned itself with the rebels via political marriage to form a new superpower, the Empire of Charis. The leaders quietly agree to continue trading with the new empire, against Church orders. In Charis and Chisholm, a plot against imperial leadership slowly builds. In the holy city of Zion, the Group of Four engage in their own machinations after the setback in Ferayd.

Emperor Cayleb Ahrmahk, with Seijin Merlin Athrawes at his side, gathers support in Chisholm before embarking for Zebediah. There, he warily accepts the surrender and fealty of its chief noble, who is known for treachery. The Imperial Marines, the first Safeholdian ground force to deploy rifled muskets, artillery and commandos on a strategic level, establish a beachhead on the namesake island of the League of Corisande. The defenders underestimate the threat and offer battle on an open field. Amid a catastrophic rout, quick thinking and heroic leadership saves part of the Corisandian Army.

The Charisians retain the advantage, but the Corisandians regroup at a strategic redoubt. Merlin eventually guides the Charisians around it, forcing the encircled enemy to surrender. While he is distracted with the offensive, a Temple Loyalist coup at home is detected in progress. He is left with no choice but to fly home and unleash his full abilities to wipe out the assassins. He also is compelled to reveal his "impossible" presence to Empress Sharleyan, but she accepts the truth and is admitted to the Inner Circle, the cadre of Charisian leaders who know humanity's journey did not begin, and will not end, on Safehold.

Meanwhile, Prince Hektor of Corisande realizes defeat and sends most of his children to exile in hopes they can be kept from Charis and the temple. He contemplates surrender, but the Inquisition has him assassinated, leaving Cayleb to be blamed. Anticipating a difficult occupation, Cayleb resolves to allow peaceful dissent, and sets up a council of Corisandian nobles to govern domestic affairs in the name of Hektor’s eldest surviving son, Prince Daivyn. Under the guidance of the Earl of Coris, Hektor's spymaster, Hektor's children escape to Delferahk, managing to evade the Charisian blockade.

The Group of Four struggle to adapt to another Charisian victory, though Grand Inquisitor Zhaspahr Clyntahn privately celebrates the success of his contingency plan for Hektor, which has inspired a resistance movement in Corisande the church will support. Later on, he takes a meeting with a cowardly bishop, who betrays to him the existence of The Circle, a secret organization dedicated to reforming the church. Clyntahn opts to bide his time, knowing this will present an opportunity to seize absolute power in Zion.

== Notes ==
It seems that the titles of both By Schism Rent Asunder and By Heresies Distressed come from lines in the hymn The Church's One Foundation.

== Reception ==
In Poland, in 2011 the book was reviewed for Poltergeist in 2011 by Bartosz Szczyżański and in 2012 for Fahrenheit by Daniel Ostrowski.

== Editions ==
The book was translated to several languages, including French, German and Polish.

=== Audiobook (Book on CD) ===
- The reader of the Audiobook version was switched to Jason Culp as of By Heresies Distressed.

(Oliver Wyman read the previous two books: Off Armageddon Reef and By Schism Rent Asunder.)
