= Beyond the Blue Horizon =

Beyond the Blue Horizon may refer to:

- "Beyond the Blue Horizon" (song), 1930 Jeanette MacDonald recording from film Monte Carlo
- Beyond the Blue Horizon (film), 1942 American exotic adventure with Dorothy Lamour
- Beyond the Blue Horizon (album), 1971 studio release by American jazz guitarist George Benson

== See also ==
- Beyond the Blue Event Horizon, 1980 American science fiction novel by Frederik Pohl
