= The Annals of the Heechee =

1987 science fiction novel by Frederik Pohl

- Cover of the first edition, published by Del Rey Books. Art by Darrell K. Sweet.
- Author: Frederik Pohl
- Series: Heechee; The Heechee Saga; Gateway trilogy
- Genre: Science fiction
- Publisher: Del Rey Books/Ballantine Books
- Publication date: 1987
- Publication place: United States
- Media type: Print (hardcover)
- Pages: (first ed.)
- Preceded by: Heechee Rendezvous
- Followed by: The Boy Who Would Live Forever

The Annals of the Heechee is a science fiction novel by the American writer Frederik Pohl, published in 1987 by Ballantine Books. It is about a dead space explorer's machine-stored version who is trying to discover why the Assassins, a mysterious type of pure energy beings, are threatening the stability of the universe. It is part of Pohl's Heechee Saga, which is about the Heechee, a fictional alien race created by Pohl. The Heechee developed advanced technologies, including interstellar space travel, but then disappeared.

== Plot ==
The novel is about the multimillionaire space explorer Robinette Broadhead's efforts to solve a mystery. Even though he died in a previous novel in the series, his personality is stored on a machine. Broadhead is trying to resolve the issue of the "Assassins", which are pure-energy beings that stopped the expansion of the universe and triggered its contraction. The Assassins have concealed themselves in a black hole. Broadhead and the Heechee are trying to find them. When the Assassins come out, they converse with one of Broadhead's data-gathering computer programs and they reveal that they are not enemies.

== Reception ==
Kirkus Reviews stated in 1987 that Pohl's Heechee series "...has been growing steadily less involving", and calls The Annals of the Heechee the "...dullest of the lot". Kirkus Reviews' states that the novel has "[n]o plot, a subplot that fizzles, chunks of cosmological explication, uninteresting aliens, and thoroughly boring characters" and calls it "...one of the least engaging Poh[l] [books] in many a year, and thus strictly for Heechee addicts."

David Langford reviewed The Annals of the Heechee for White Dwarf #98, and stated that "Though the quality of writing stays at an unflashy 'good average' throughout, this is a classy example of hard SF as it sometimes used to be."
