= M. Keaton =

American fiction writer

M. Keaton is an American fiction author who writes for a variety of genres, ranging from science fiction to historical fantasy. He is also the Bard in Residence for the NWA Renaissance Faire. He currently lives in Arkansas.

Keaton is a key figure in the Sanctuary Press Writing Workshops, which are held in Michigan at science fiction conventions, most notably Penguicon and ConClave. He is a popular panelist at both of these gatherings, as well as at other conventions, such as Omegacon.

Calamity's Child, his second novel, was released in October 2008 and premiered at ConClave 33.

== Bibliography ==
- Speakers and Kings
- Calamity's Child

=== Selected short stories ===
- "Subject Real", Ray Gun Revival (2006), Issue 8, p. 6.
- "Pinny", Abyss and Apex (2007).
- "23rd Psalm", Breath of Heaven (2008).
- "Pastels", Mindspring (2008).
- "Calamity's Child", Ray Gun Revival (2008–2009), Issues 43 and on.
