= Safehold =

Fictional world by David Weber

The Safehold series
- Off Armageddon Reef; By Schism Rent Asunder; By Heresies Distressed; A Mighty Fortress; How Firm a Foundation; Midst Toil and Tribulation; Like a Mighty Army; Hell's Foundations Quiver; At the Sign of Triumph; Through Fiery Trials
- Author: David Weber
- Country: United States
- Language: English
- Genre: Science fiction
- Publisher: Tor Books
- Published: January 9, 2007
- Media type: Print
- No. of books: 10

Safehold is a science fiction book series by David Weber, currently consisting of ten titles, the latest released in January 2019. The series is mostly set around the 31st century, on a distant world dubbed "Safehold" where a group of humans are in hiding from the Gbaba, an alien enemy responsible for the end of all other human civilization.

The humans on Safehold avoid detection by reverting to a pre-electrical, pre-industrial technology base. This status is enforced by a religious belief system discouraging scientific curiosity and forbidding any higher technological innovation on penalty of death. The threat of the Gbaba is barely mentioned in the books so far; the main issue is the divergence of the official church from its original aims versus the outlying areas which deny the leadership of the corrupt vicars.

Every book after the first has a name taken from a hymn.

== Plot ==
=== Series background ===
In the 24th century humanity has spread to other planets to create the Terran Federation, made up of Earth and its colonies. Explorers discover the remains of an alien civilization and the enemy that destroyed it, the Gbaba. Ten years later the Gbaba attack humanity and despite their preparation, the Terran Federation's forces are annihilated. Attempts by the survivors to flee and form new colonies are largely unsuccessful, with the exception of a single terraforming team led by Pei Shan-Wei. They name this new world Safehold. To avoid drawing the attention of the Gbaba, who keep sharp eyes out for any signs of advanced technology, drastic measures are taken to avoid any form of industrialization. The eight million surviving colonists have their memories re-written, with only the original command crew allowed to retain any of their prior knowledge.

Much to Shan-Wei's horror, the administrator tasked with re-writing the memories, Eric Langhorne, has his own plan: to set up a new society where he is worshipped as the leader of a race chosen by divinity. Shan-Wei is unable to stop Langhorne, whose faction demonizes and ultimately kills Shan-Wei and her supporters. Centuries later, it is discovered that Shan-Wei had a backup plan: she hid an android containing the personality and memories of Nimue Alban, a sympathetic Terran Federation Navy tactical officer, in a room full of technology and weapons. Upon awakening Nimue is tasked with destroying the Church, saving humanity, and eventually defeating the Gbaba.

=== Volumes ===
1. Off Armageddon Reef (2007)
2. By Schism Rent Asunder (2008)
3. By Heresies Distressed (2009)
4. A Mighty Fortress (2010)
5. How Firm a Foundation (2011)
6. Midst Toil and Tribulation (2012)
7. Like a Mighty Army (2014)
8. Hell's Foundations Quiver (2015)
9. At the Sign of Triumph (2016)
10. Through Fiery Trials (2019)

== Development ==
When Weber initially began work on the series he planned the series to span a minimum of nine books. In his site's FAQ section, Weber has commented that he chose to use a divergent spelling of the name Nimue partially in order to suit the voice-activated software he uses during writing.

Weber has an interest in history, which he applied to the Safehold series—on his website he notes that the series "gives me an opportunity to write about 'wet-navy' warfare that hasn't come my way very often, which probably pushes up the 'enjoyment quotient' to a least some extent."

== Themes ==
The series contains themes of religion and personal decision-making and choices, which Weber noted in a 2014 interview with the Tor/Forge Blog are common elements in his body of work. He stated that he sees "technology as a liberating force, although (like religion) there's always a Darth Vader dark side waiting for the unwary."

In the same interview Weber commented on readers picking up on themes of gender roles in the Safehold series. He specified that he did not include this as a "deliberate marketing point" as he just "[happens] to prefer strong, competent people who are willing to take chances for the things they believe in (even when they're not necessarily the things I might believe in), regardless of whether they're male or female." He further answered that he sees this as "not so much a case of challenging gender roles as it is of simply ignoring them."

Other themes in the series include the blending of "elements of science fiction and fantasy as well as human government as an Empire".

== Release ==
The first novel in the series, Off Armageddon Reef, was first published in hardcover in the United States during 2007, through Tor Books. Subsequent novels in the series were released each following year, also through Tor Books, until 2012. The seventh book in the series, Like a Mighty Army, was released in 2014 through Tor Books. The releases for the eighth and ninth books in the series were released in 2015 and 2016, respectively. The tenth book in the series, Through Fiery Trials, was published in 2019.

The novels have received audiobook adaptations; Like a Mighty Army was released in 2013 through Macmillan Audio and was narrated by Oliver Wyman.

== Reception ==
Critical reception for the Safehold series has been generally positive and the novels typically place in the New York Times Hardcover Fiction Best Seller List for their week of release.

=== Reviews and honors ===
The Guardian found Off Armageddon Reef to have a predictable ending and called the character development "perfunctory", but applauded Weber's pacing and vision.

Donald Jacob Uitvlugt reviewed the first two books in the series for Ray Gun Revival in January 2009, writing that "The concept of this series is a very clever one" as it allows the author to "play with the best fantasy tropes in an SFnal world", creating "an almost perfect blend of science fiction and fantasy". Uitvlugt also praised Weber for creating "well developed characters" and an "epic series" that he compared to "George R. R. Martin's Song of Ice and Fire without the relentless, depressing plot".

=== The New York Times and sales ===
Off Armageddon Reef was a cumulative bestseller, entering the New York Times Best Seller list at number 33. The placement of subsequent novels improved, with By Heresies Distressed debuted at number 11 on the July 17, 2009 New York Times best selling hardcover fiction list and remaining on the list for two additional weeks, placing at number 30 for the week of July 30, 2009. A Mighty Fortress was met with similar success as it placed at #9 for its first week of release and remained on the list for a total of three weeks before dropping off the list.

Like a Mighty Army is, as of Through Fiery Trials, the entry with the highest debut on the New York Times hardcover fiction best seller list, placing at #5 for its first week of release. The placement of the following novels for their first week of release dropped, with Hell's Foundations Quiver, At the Sign of Triumph, and Through Fiery Trials debuting at #16, #14, and #12, respectively.

=== Awards and honors ===
Safehold has been nominated for several awards, beginning with the 2009 nomination of Off Armageddon Reef for the Arthur C. Clarke Award for best science fiction novel published in the United Kingdom. The second novel in the series, By Schism Rent Asunder, was nominated for the 2009 Prometheus Award. The series would be nominated for this award again in 2011 for A Mighty Fortress. and in 2013 for Midst Toil and Tribulation.

In 2016 the eighth entry, Hell's Foundation Quiver, received the Dragon Award for the Best Military Science Fiction or Fantasy Novel, marking the first time that the series won a major award.

Honors include Off Armageddon Reef placing on Booklist's list of top ten SF audiobooks for 2008.
