= A Mighty Fortress (novel) =

Novel by David Weber

- Cover of A Mighty Fortress
- Author: David Weber
- Cover artist: Stephen Youll
- Language: English
- Genre: Science fiction
- Publisher: Tor Books
- Publication date: April 13, 2010
- Publication place: United States
- Media type: Print (Hardcover)
- Pages: 720
- ISBN: 0-7653-1505-X
- OCLC: 428027070
- Preceded by: By Heresies Distressed
- Followed by: How Firm a Foundation

A Mighty Fortress is a science fiction novel by American writer David Weber. The fourth book in the Safehold series, it was published by Tor Books on April 13, 2010. It debuted at #9 on the New York Times Bestseller List for hardcover fiction, following in the steps of previous titles in the series which also debuted on the list. The book dropped to #24 in the second week, then to #29 in week three before dropping off the list, for a total of three weeks on the list.

Preview chapters of the book were published before the book was released.

The title of A Mighty Fortress comes from Martin Luther's hymn "A Mighty Fortress Is Our God" (German, "Ein feste Burg ist unser Gott").

== Plot ==
Following Charis' conquest of Corisande, the people of Corisande are becoming increasingly restive under the occupation (despite the fact that Charis is governing both wisely and compassionately) and two major resistance movements begin to coalesce—one in the capital city of Manchyr and one in the Northern aristocratic estates. Both conspiracies enjoin "Temple Loyalists", who view the Church of Charis as an abomination that must be destroyed, with secular leaders, who want to take back their nation from the foreign occupation and both seem to be getting very well organized. While Merlin uses his advanced technology to maintain a constant watch over these groups, he, Emperor Cayleb and Empress Sharleyan (who is now pregnant with her first child) decide not to move against them now and wait until they can crush all opposition in a single stroke. Meanwhile, in Talkyra—the capital city of Delferahk, where the surviving children of Corisandian Prince Hektor are now in exile—the Earl of Coris is summoned to Zion to consult with the church leadership. While Coris is loath to leave Princess Iris and Prince Daivyn alone and despite his suspicions regarding the Inquisition's involvement in their father's death, Coris has little choice but to comply with the Temple's demands.

As Sharleyan's pregnancy progresses, Merlin takes her to Nimue's Cave under the Mountains of Light so that she can be examined by the medical computer there. He's forced to come clean about the fact that he injected both them and several other people with the nanotech designed to fight diseases and help heal injuries faster and explains that he was determined not to lose any of them to some germ. In Dohlar, the Earl of Thirsk is once again put in a naval command when it becomes clear to his superiors that his reports about the Charisians' ships were accurate. Yet he is still forced to contend with court politics since his former, incompetent predecessor had all too many allies who did not enjoy being proven wrong. Nonetheless, Thirsk turns out to be a shrewd operator, as he manages to get his crews trained very well while changing the general practices of the Dohlaran Fleet, which earns him even more enemies in Dohlar and in the Temple. In Tellesberg, Archbishop Staynair is preparing for his journey to Corisande and reluctantly tells Baron Wave Thunder about the trunkloads of reports Adorai Dynnys handed to him about corruption within the temple. While Wave Thunder is angry at him for not sharing such intelligence with him, Staynair states that it was given to him under the seal of the confessional so as to protect the source who has already risked her life to get it to them and Wave Thunder relents. In Corisande, Father Tymahn Hahskans begins to draw attention to himself in his sermons on the corruption within the church that he has noticed for a long time yet was forbidden from speaking of. His sermons begin to pose a threat to the Temple Loyalists who are attempting to encourage public unrest and civil disobedience in the capital. As a result, Hahskans is abducted from his home and then brutally tortured to death and left in a public place upon the orders of Aidryn Waimyn, the former Intendent of Corisande. Merlin, who is notified about the abduction by OWL too late to save Hahskans, moves against the conspiracy in Manchyr, sending an anonymous message to Sir Koryn Gahrvai, the son of Earl of Anvil Rock, who proceeds to arrest the conspirators, among whom they find the former Intendent. He is later defrocked from his post by the Church in Corisande and tried for murder and conspiracy and consequently executed along with most of his fellow conspirators.

Coris arrives at the temple in the dead of winter and meets with Traynair and Clyntahn to discuss possible ways to encourage a popular revolt in his homeland. Unbeknown to Coris, Clyntahn has managed to move a spy near him to report on his activities, and who gives a detailed report to his deputy, Rayno. In Chisholm, Prince Nahrmahn and his wife Olyvya are brought fully into the truth about Merlin, a revelation they manage to handle quite well, and both are issued communicators and given access to OWL. Merlin takes the opportunity of Sharleyan and Cayleb's stay in the palace during winter to go on another mission to Zion, where he disguises himself as a Silkiahan merchant by the name of Ahbraim Zhevons and makes contact with Madam Ahnzhelyk, The Circle's most prominent ally. He notifies her that Adorai Dynnys arrived safely at Charis and that it's time for her to pack up and leave. She in turn, arranges the smuggling out of over 200 people related to the circle as well as the families of several vicars, the Archbishop of Glacierheart and several other bishops, just as the Inquisition moves against The Circle. Rather than be taken alive, Hawuerd Wylsyn (one of The Circle's leaders), kills his brother Samyl and then fights the Inquisition's guards until he himself is killed. All told, Clyntahn arrests over 2000 people, including over 30 vicars (a tenth of the entire Council of Vicars), dozens of bishops and archbishops, along with all their families and associates, most of whom are brutally questioned and later executed with the full rigor of the "Punishment of Schueler". Earl Coris leaves Zion with extreme haste just as this happens. Vicar Duchairn, while horrified at Clyntahn's actions, is helpless to stop it, yet feels that he must do something to mitigate the damage caused by the High Inquisitor's reign of terror. He notifies Trynair that while he refuses to support Clyntahn's actions and will take no part in them, he will not oppose him, either. Rather, he will fund all the charitable orders so as to present a more gentle face for mother church to help those who will be hurt in the Holy War that has just been declared and Trynair agrees to support Duchairn's decision.

Meanwhile, in Corisande, Maikel Staynair makes a pastoral visit accompanied by Merlin and in his own unique way, buys the hearts and minds of the Corisandians. Merlin, in turn, notifies the regency council about the Northern Conspiracy and how the Emperor and Empress have known about for some time, waiting for them to organize so as to decapitate the resistance in one fell swoop and snare the treasonous Grand Duke of Zebediah along with them. He also tells them that they and Viceroy Chermyn will be given the necessary information to move upon the conspirators by a network of "seijin" like himself who have been watching the princedom for some time and who are experts at unobtrusively collecting critical information. Soon afterwards, a traitor in the Imperial Charisian Army sends modern rifles to Corisande through Grand Duke Zebediah and the Regency Council moves in on the traitors, arresting them and the former bishop-executor of the Church in Corisande along with them.

In Charis, Master Howsmyn and his researchers begin developing an exploding shell for the navy's new iron cannons, while Earl Grey Harbor opens clandestine negotiations with King Gorjah of Tarot. Earl Lock Island uses additional units of the navy to apply even greater pressure on Gorjah, while Merlin, disguised yet again as Zhevons, infiltrates Gorjah bedchamber and convinces him (at dagger point) to agree to join the Charisian Empire. Sharleyan and Cayleb return to Charis just before she gives birth to the Crown Princess Alanah. In Dohlar, Earl Thirsk manages to force the Charisians to retreat from their forward base, inflicting serious losses on several of their units. The Temple, having declared Holy War against Charis and with its new fleet ready, orders the ships to move out and join ships from other mainland fleets in Dohlar. Cayleb and Sharleyan, decide to meet the bulk of the Church's fleet with over 60 ships of their own, however, they discover too late, that the Church had managed to deceive them, sending their ships to the Desnairian Empire instead, by way of the Tarot Channel (as a reminder to Gorjah that they are still in charge). Caught with their most of their fleet badly out of position and unable to do anything about the Church's move on Tarot, Cayleb and Sharleyan decide to send Earl Lock Island and his 25 ships against over 120 galleons, though only 90 are armed. However, Howsmyn manages to complete his trials on the new shells and manages to provide some of Lock Islands ships with the new guns and a small amount of the new shells. Lock Island then leads a daring nighttime ambush against the Church's fleet and manages to catch it completely surprised, eliminating an entire column of ships before they can respond. Once his ships penetrate the Church's formation, Lock Island sends a signal flare into the air and the ships equipped with the new guns fire the new shells. The sudden destructiveness of the new weapons overwhelms the Church's fleet, shattering its cohesiveness and morale. Only nine manage to escape, with all the others being captured, sunk or burned. The cost to Charisians is high, as nearly half of their own galleons are destroyed. Emperor Cayleb's cousin, Bryahn Lock Island, is also killed in the battle.

As Cayleb mourns his cousin's death, Merlin comforts him as best as he can, telling him that Bryahn only did his duty, as Cayleb would've done in his place. Privately, Merlin reflects that the church is likely to rebuild its fleet and try to destroy Charis again, despite this staggering loss, since it has no other choice.

== Reception ==
The book was nominated for the 2011 Prometheus Award.

The book was reviewed by Daniel Ostrowski for the Polish fanzine Fahrenheit.

== Editions ==
The book was translated to several languages, including German and Polish.

=== Audiobook (Book on CD) ===
- The reader of the Audiobook version was switched to Jason Culp as of By Heresies Distressed. (Oliver Wyman read the first two books: Off Armageddon Reef and By Schism Rent Asunder.)
