= Heechee Rendezvous =

1984 science fiction novel by Frederik Pohl

- First edition cover
- Author: Frederik Pohl
- Cover artist: Darrell K. Sweet
- Series: Heechee; The Heechee Saga; Gateway trilogy
- Genre: Science fiction
- Publisher: Del Rey Books/Ballantine Books
- Publication date: May 1984
- Publication place: United States
- Media type: Print (hardcover)
- Pages: 311 (first ed.)
- ISBN: 0-345-30062-9
- OCLC: 9918277
- LC Class: PS3566.O36 H4 1984
- Preceded by: Beyond the Blue Event Horizon
- Followed by: The Annals of the Heechee

Heechee Rendezvous is a science fiction novel by the American writer Frederik Pohl, published in 1984 by the Del Rey imprint of Ballantine Books. It is a sequel to Gateway (1977) and Beyond the Blue Event Horizon (1981) and is set about three decades after Gateway. It has been cataloged as the third book in a six-book series called Heechee or The Heechee Saga (the Heechee are a fictional alien race that use advanced technology, created by Pohl) but Kirkus reviewed it as completing a trilogy and a German-language edition of the three books was published as the Gateway trilogy (Die Gateway-Trilogie, Munich: Heyne Verlag, 2004) after all six were out.

== Plot ==
Robinette Broadhead, a married millionaire with health problems, returns in this novel. Even with his need for medical care, Broadhead does not feel that he deserves transplants to keep him alive, as he is still feeling guilty about his horrible journey to a black hole many years ago. He still attempts to research more about the advanced alien Heechees and their star-travelling technology.

At the same time, a madman named Wan attempts to search for his father within black holes, using stolen equipment and a Heechee ship. Wan's probing is noticed by a sentient race of slow-moving creatures who inform a Heechee patrol that is sent out of their black hole to observe the galaxy. Fearing that humans may alert a malevolent race of beings known as the Assassins, the Heechee patrol tries to find out more about human achievements in space flight and whether or not the damage done by them can be undone. Wan's probing also releases Gelle-Klara Moynlin from her two decade-long entrapment. Moynlin was a companion of Robinette on his journey to the black hole, which Moynlin experienced as only several elapsed days. The journeys of these past and future friends of Robinette begin to converge, and in the end, humans finally meet the Heechee race.

== Reception ==
Dave Langford reviewed Heechee Rendezvous for White Dwarf #57, and stated that "The ending's less than perfect, with some problems ignored rather than confronted, but Heechee Rendezvous completes a worthy trilogy."

Readers of Locus ranked Heechee Rendezvous third in the 1985 poll to confer the annual Locus Award for Best SF Novel.
