= Oliver Wyman (actor) =

American voice actor

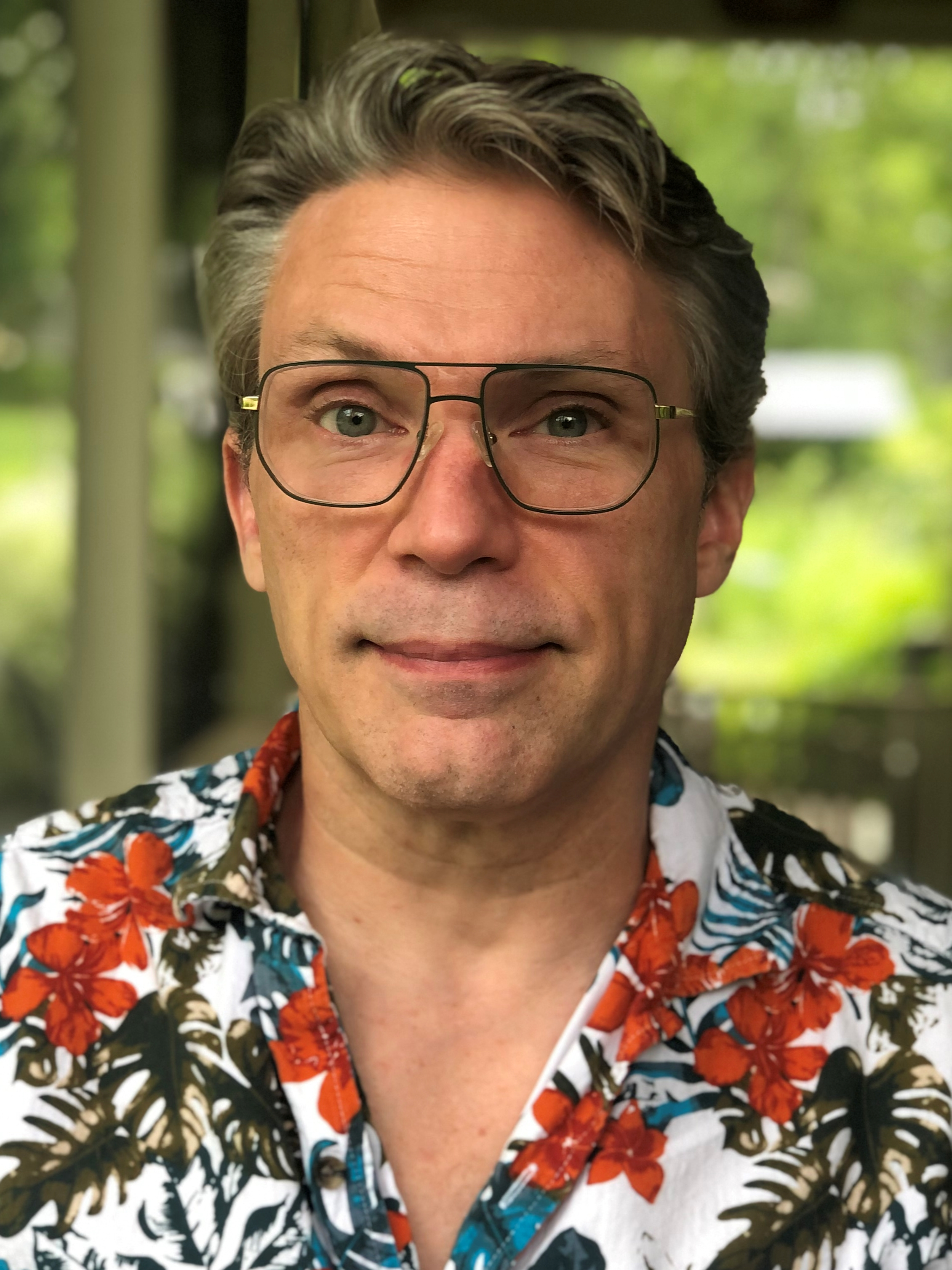
- Wyman in 2021
- Born: July 20; New York, New York, U.S.
- Other name: Pete Zarustica
- Occupation: Voice actor
- Years active: 1994–present

Oliver Wyman (born July 20) is an American voice actor, known for his work in animation, television and video games.

He is also known by the alias of Pete Zarustica.

== Career ==
In anime and video games, Wyman voiced the characters Morty Oyamada, Zang-Ching and Boris Tepes Dracula III from Shaman King, and Big the Cat in the Sonic the Hedgehog franchise.

Wyman has also narrated over 350 audiobooks. He has won four Audie Awards from the Audio Publishers Association, twenty-one Earphone Awards from AudioFile, and two Listen Up Awards from Publishers Weekly.

== Filmography ==
=== Film ===
Year	Title	Role	Notes	Source
2003	Jungle Emperor Leo	Tom		
2006	Pokémon: Lucario and the Mystery of Mew	Lieutenant Banks		
2008	Impy's Wonderland	Eddie		
2008	Piper Penguin and His Fantastic Flying Machines	Piper		
2010	Animals United	Smiley the Tasmanian Devil		
2014	Pokémon the Movie: Diancie and the Cocoon of Destruction	Argus Steel	Credited as Pete Zarustica	
2018	Pokémon the Movie: The Power of Us	Zeraora	Credited as Pete Zarustica	
2019	Sheep and Wolves: Pig Deal	Moz		

=== Anime ===
Year	Title	Role	Notes	Source
1994	Iria: Zeiram the Animation	Dr. Tohka		
2000	One Piece	Jango, Onion	9 episodes	
2003	Shaman King	Morty Oyamada, Zang-Chin, Boris Tepes Dracula III		
2003–2006	Sonic X	Big the Cat		
2005–2006	Yu-Gi-Oh!	Zigfried von Schroeder, Dr. Alex Brisbane, Alexander the Great, Aknadin	Credited as Pete Zarustica	
2005–2008	Yu-Gi-Oh! GX	Aster Phoenix, Brier, Neo-Spacian Aqua Dolphin, Guardian of the Labyrinth	Credited as Pete Zarustica	
2008	Yu-Gi-Oh! 5Ds	Alex	Credited as Pete Zarustica	
2017–2018	Yu-Gi-Oh! Arc-V	Aster Phoenix	Credited as Pete Zarustica	
2021	Shaman King	Manta Oyamada	Reboot	
2023	Pokémon: Paldean Winds	Director Clavell	Credited as Pete Zarustica	

=== Television ===
Year	Title	Role	Notes	Source
2001	12 Tiny Christmas Tales	Blitzen, Angry Guy	Short film Credited as Pete Zarustica	
2003–2005	Kenny the Shark	Burton Plushtoy III	26 episodes	
2003–2009	Teenage Mutant Ninja Turtles	Professor Honeycutt/Fugitoid	17 episodes	
2014–2015	Wallykazam!	Baby Snow Dragon, Flouse (noise)	4 episodes	

=== Video games ===
Year	Title	Role	Notes	Source
2004	Grand Theft Auto: San Andreas	Pedestrian		
2004	Conflict: Vietnam	Various		
2005	The Warriors	Luther		
2009	Teenage Mutant Ninja Turtles: Smash-Up	Fugitoid		
2010	Sonic & Sega All-Stars Racing	Big the Cat	Uncredited	
2012	The Dark Knight Rises: Mobile Game	Commissioner James Gordon		
2015	Lego Dimensions	Big the Cat		
2017	Yu-Gi-Oh! Duel Links	Aster Phoenix		

=== Web ===
Year	Title	Role	Notes	Source
2021	Sonic and Tails R	Big the Cat	2 episodes YouTube fan-made series	

=== Audiobook narration ===
- American Gods by Neil Gaiman
- A Little Life by Hanya Yanagihara
- Atomic Lobster by Tim Dorsey
- Beyond the Blue Event Horizon by Frederik Pohl
- By Schism Rent Asunder by David Weber (Safehold series).
- Gateway by Frederik Pohl
- Heechee Rendezvous by Frederik Pohl
- Hot, Flat, and Crowded by Thomas Friedman
- Interface by Neal Stephenson and J. Frederick George
- Island of the Sequined Love Nun by Christopher Moore
- It's Not About the Bike by Lance Armstrong
- A Million Little Pieces by James Frey
- Monster Hunter Alpha by Larry Correia
- Monster Hunter International by Larry Correia
- Monster Hunter Vendetta by Larry Correia
- Nuclear Jellyfish by Tim Dorsey
- Off Armageddon Reef by David Weber (Safehold series).
- Practical Demonkeeping by Christopher Moore
- Ricky Ricotta's Mighty Robot by Dav Pilkey and Dan Santat
- The World Is Flat by Thomas Friedman

== Awards ==
=== Audie Awards ===
Year	Category	Title	Result
2001	Outstanding Inspirational/Spiritual	It's Not About The Bike by Lance Armstrong	Won
2006	Outstanding Non-Fiction, Unabridged	The World Is Flat by Thomas Friedman	Won
2009	Outstanding Non-Fiction	Hot, Flat, and Crowded by Thomas Friedman	Won

=== Earphone Awards ===
Year	Title	Result
2003	The Best Business Stories of the Year 2002 by Andrew Leckey	Won
2003	The Joy of Pi by David Blatner	Won
2003	A Million Little Pieces by James Frey	Won
2004	The Big Year by Mark Obmascik	Won
2005	The World is Flat by Thomas Friedman	Won
2008	Hurricane Punch by Tim Dorsey	Won
2008	Atomic Lobster by Tim Dorsey	Won
2008	Juggling Elephants by Jones Loflin	Won
2008	Leading Change by John Kotter	Won
2008	Winter's Tale by Mark Helprin	Won
2009	Practical Demonkeeping by Christopher Moore	Won
2010	Annexed by Sharon Dogar	Won
2010	Interface by Neal Stephenson	Won
2011	Electric Barracuda by Tim Dorsey	Won
2012	WWW: Wonder by Robert J. Sawyer	Won

=== Listen Up Awards ===
Year	Title	Result
2003	A Million Little Pieces by James Frey	Won
2008	Hot, Flat, and Crowded by Thomas Friedman	Won
