= Hell's Foundations Quiver =

Book by David Weber

- Author: David Weber
- Cover artist: Stephen Youll
- Language: English
- Genre: Science fiction
- Publisher: Tor Books
- Publication date: October 13, 2015
- Publication place: United States
- Media type: Hardcover
- Pages: 784
- ISBN: 978-0765321879
- Preceded by: Like a Mighty Army
- Followed by: At the Sign of Triumph

Hell's Foundations Quiver is a science fiction novel by American writer David Weber, the eighth book in the Safehold Series. It was released on October 13, 2015. Like the preceding novel, the title comes from the hymn "Onward, Christian Soldiers" (second stanza).

== Plot ==
Merlin Athrawes is confronted by Aivah Pahrshan, who reveals to him her suspicions that he and Ahbraim Zhevons are one and the same and that she had been tracking his activities for several years now. She reveals that she is the leader of the "Sisterhood of Saint Kohdy," an ancient secret society founded after the death of Seijin Kohdy (who was previously believed to be mythical) under suspicious circumstances; the Church subsequently deleted his existence from its official record and annihilated the original Abbey of Saint Kohdy in a Rakurai strike. Aivah also reveals that Kohdy's tomb, journal and sword ("Helm Cleaver") were all relocated before the destruction of the Abbey and that large portions of the journal are in Spanish, a language the Sisterhood cannot understand. Despite the grave risks involved, the Inner Circle decides to bring Aivah and her personal maid Sandaria to Nimue's Cave and expose them to the complete truth, a truth that shocks them to their very core; neither suspected (despite the Sisterhood's essential doubts about some of the "archangels" and the Church) that the Holy Writ itself was based on falsehoods. Eventually, both accept the truth.

The Spanish portions of Saint Kohdy's journal are translated and the Inner Circle discovers previously unknown details about the War Against the Fallen. Saint Kohdy was in fact Sergeant Major Cody Cortazar, late of the Terran Federation Marine Corps. He had been drafted due to his combat skills and training by the surviving command crew to combat the "Fallen Angels" and their "mortal" supporters while winning the support of the ignorant population. To accomplish this, the command crew had sought to selectively reactivate his suppressed memories and in doing so had allowed him to remember his native tongue and fragments of his previous life on Earth. His experiences against someone the church had ruled a "demon" had shaken him to the point of questioning the "archangels" and he sought to meet with Schueler himself for reassurance (a meeting from which he did not return alive). Ultimately, the Inner Circle and Sisterhood agree to work together, and Merlin travels to Zion in disguise to make contact with the Sisterhoods' agents there.

In northern Siddarmark, Baron Green Valley takes troops specialized in winter combat and seizes key positions to the north of Bishop Militant Bahrnabai Wyrshym's positions in the Sylmahn Gap. Despite the wisdom of pulling Wyrshym and his troops back, the Grand Inquisitor refuses to yield any ground. Having blocked the Church's forces from the north, the allies subsequently attack Wyrshym's positions from the south in the Gap. With Harchong's relief force still five-days away from being able to relieve him and after sustaining heavy losses, Wyrshym is forced to surrender. Green Valley then orders the liberation of as many of the Church's concentration camps while Merlin, whose assassination of specific inquisitors and overzealous church guardsman cause the Inquisition to tone down its atrocities, rescues a family of "suspected heretics" and brings them to the Cave. They're given a new chance to rebuild their lives elsewhere.

In the south, the Dohlaran Army is forced to retreat while Bishop Militant Cahnyr Kaitswyrth's forces are surrounded and defeated by the Allies (Kaitswyrth subsequently commits suicide). In the aftermath of such massive reversals, Vicar Zhaspahr Clyntahn attempts to have Maigwair removed from his position through political maneuvering. However, the secret meeting of his loyalists at a secluded church in Zion is bombed by the Sisterhoods' agents (named the "Fist of God") with Merlin's help. The attack, coupled with Maigwair's swift action to secure his position and the propaganda broadsheets claiming responsibility for this attack (as well as for the assassination of other vicars), seriously undermines Clyntahn's position and the Inquisition's aura of invincibility. However, the evidence leads Wyllym Rayno, Chyntahn's second in command in the Inquisition, to conclude that the Fist of God is indeed, in league with "demons."

In Dohlar, Ahlverez finds himself fighting for his political career after his defeat in Siddarmark. Meanwhile, Dohlar's new "screw galleys" are pitted against a Charisian squadron of galleons and one ironclad with both sides sustaining heavy losses. The battle ends with a Dohlaran victory and the capture of the iron clad and over 500 Charisian seamen, though some Charisian ships escape. Despite attempts by the Dohlaran leadership to convince the Church otherwise, Clyntahn demands the extradition of all the Charisian prisoners for a huge auto-da-fé in Zion, with the intent to shore up the Inquisition's position in the eyes of the faithful.

Hektor Aplyn-Ahrmahk and Baron Sarmouth (a recent inductee to the Inner Circle), with the assistance of the SNARCs, lead a daring nighttime mission to save the Charisian prisoners from the church's ships and return the Dohlaran prisoners from the raid back to Gorath. His plans for the prisoners in ruins, a furious Clyntahn orders the arrest of all the Dohlaran officers involved but is swayed (barely) by Rayno's logical argument that doing so might damage the war effort, as the Dohlaran Navy has provided the only victory against Charis that year. Clyntahn, still suspicious of the Dohlaran Navy's commander, "invites" Thirsk's family for their pilgrimage to Zion. Anticipating these actions, Merlin and Nimue intercept the ship carrying Thirsk's daughters, sons-in-law and grandchildren, rescuing his family and blowing the ship up in the middle of the sea to eliminate any witnesses.

In the aftermath of their presumed deaths, a deeply depressed Thirsk contemplates what he is likely to be forced to say in support of the Church's version (that his family died in a battle with Charisian ships). The book concludes when he is suddenly interrupted by Merlin Athrawes, in his own townhouse study, who tells him that they "need to talk."

== Reception ==
The novel won the 2016 Dragon Awards in the Best Military Science Fiction or Fantasy Novel category.

== Editions ==
The novel was translated to German and Polish.
