= Midst Toil and Tribulation =

Novel by David Weber

- Cover of first printing hardcover.
- Author: David Weber
- Cover artist: Stephen Youll
- Language: English
- Genre: Science fiction
- Publisher: Tor Books
- Publication date: September 18, 2012
- Publication place: United States
- ISBN: 978-0765321558; 978-1427226334 (audio)
- OCLC: 796230232
- Preceded by: How Firm a Foundation
- Followed by: Like a Mighty Army

Midst Toil and Tribulation is a science fiction novel by American writer David Weber. The sixth book in the Safehold series, it was published by Tor Books on September 18, 2012. The title comes from the fourth stanza of the hymn "The Church's One Foundation", which has already been the source for several titles in the series.

== Plot summary ==
Following the events at the end of How Firm a Foundation, civil war has wracked the Republic of Siddarmark, causing widespread starvation and violence between those loyal to Lord Protector Greyghor Stohnar and the Temple Loyalists, who have risen up against him at the behest of Zhaspahr Clyntahn, the Grand Inquisitor of the Church of God Awaiting. The suddenness of the uprising (code named "The Sword of Schueler") has "officially" caught the heretical Empire of Charis by surprise, and Emperor Cayleb and Empress Sharleyan begin to make preparations to send an expeditionary force to assist Stohnar in repelling the Church's invasion force while also sending large quantities of food to help the starving population. In the meantime, Princess Irys, Prince Daivyn and Earl Coris arrive at long last in Tellesberg, where they are met by the emperor and empress. While they officially recognize Prince Daivyn as the legitimate ruler of Corisande and grant him and his sister freedom of movement throughout Old Charis, political considerations preclude the possibility of Hektor Daykyn's children from returning home to Corisande. While the prepubescent Daivyn is having the time of his life playing with noble boys his age (and generally getting into trouble) Irys is faced with a serious crisis of faith and conscience, as she confronts all the implications of their current political situation as well as all the religious implications of Charis' push to innovate and seek out that knowledge which the Church of God Awaiting defines as forbidden.

Meanwhile, Charis has finally constructed steam engines that are now in use in various manufactories and are now being added to the design of the new ironclads. At Merlin's behest, 4 riverboats are plated in iron and fitted with steam engines, to be sent to Siddarmark for the upcoming campaign. As Ruhsyl Thairis, the Duke of Eastshare, and Kynt Clareyk, the Baron of Green Valley, begin marching their troops through Raven's Land to reach seaports where ships could most quickly pick them up and sail them to Siddarmark, fighting continues to rage on between armed Temple Loyalists and forces loyal to the Lord Protector in the strategically critical provinces of Glacierheart and South March as well as in the Sylmahn Gap with a scratch force of Charisian marines assisting where possible. But with winter all but over, the Church's Army of God begins to march into the northern provinces of the Republic while Dohlar and Desnair send troops to the Southern provinces. With such enormous armies at its doorstep, the decimated Republican Army cannot hope to hold. Realizing these odds, Cayleb dispatches several thousand marines and armed seaman from Old Charis, under the command of General Hauwerd Braygart, the Earl of Hanth, to stop the invasion in the south.

After leaving Breygart's forces in South March, Cayleb and Merlin sail to Siddar City, the capital of Siddarmark, where the emperor meets Lord Protector Greyghor and signs a mutual defense treaty. Meanwhile, Irys and Daivyn, accompany Archbishop Maikel Staynair and the empress on their voyage to Chisholm, during which Irys finally decides to take the final step in accepting the schism and commits herself to the cause of the Church of Charis. Upon arrival in Chisholm, Empress Sharleyan presents her with a choice which would allow them to return home to Corisande and Daivyn to claim his throne: to accept the terms of the armistice imposed upon them (and the continuance of the Charisian occupation) or join the Empire of Charis as Emerald and Tarot have done. The Earl of Coris, knowing that her father would have chosen the former possibility, counsels her to take the latter course as he had seen what her father's cynicism, pride and ambition had done to Corisande and the world. However, Sharleyan also demands that Irys agree to marry Lieutenant Hektor Aplyn-Ahrmahk (Cayleb's adoptive son) as an additional assurance of the House of Daykyn's continued faith (a demand that is not all that onerous to Irys, as she and the Hektor have grown fond of each other). During this time, Merlin activates a VR module in Nimue's Cave, uploaded with the neural imprint of the deceased Prince Nahrmahn, which he created shortly before the prince's death. After apologizing for doing this to him without his knowledge (or consent), he allows Nahrmahn to choose whether or not he wants to continue to exist in a virtual world and help them take down the Church of God Awaiting. Nahrmahn eventually decides to continue to exist and eventually reveals his existence to the rest of the Inner Circle, all of whose members are happy to have him back, even if only as a disembodied neural pattern.

In Siddarmark, the war turns uglier as the Desnarian army decimates 2 Siddarmarkian pike regiments, and the survivors are "mercifully" killed upon the orders the Desnarian commander who is horrified by the idea of handing them over to the Inquisition as ordered. In the Northern and Western provinces, the Army of God crushes all remaining resistance to the Temple Loyalists while the Inquisition moves in to establish internment camps where people suspected of heresy can be properly "questioned". In the Sylmahn Gap, the Army of God purposefully throws wave after wave of its troops at the Siddarmarkian forces holding the Gap in an attempt to overwhelm the defenders. Despite horrendous losses on both sides, the Siddarmarkian troops manage to hold their position. In the West, Brigadier Taisyn along with 4,000 Siddarmarkian and Charisian troops, blocks a critical river to prevent the Army of God from sweeping into Glacierheart. And in the South, Earl of Hanth manages to ambush the vanguard of the Royal Dohlaran Army forcing them to retreat, but lacking enough troops to overwhelm their new fortified position, he is forced to fortify his position with the Imperial Desnairian Army closing in from the South.

At long last, the Imperial Charisian Army lands in Siddar City along with their new weapons and the 4 ironclads. Duke Eastshare takes half the troops and marches to relieve Brigadier Taisyn's troops in the defense of Glacierheart, but fails to arrive before the Army of God overwhelms his position (at an atrocious cost in blood to the Church's forces). Eastshare establishes a new roadblock further to the West and prepares for the arrival of the Army of God. Meanwhile, Baron Green Valley takes the other half of the available troops to the Sylmahn Gap, where the new breech-loading rifles and mortars come as a most unpleasant surprise to the Church's forces who are forced back on the defensive. Upon Merlin's advice, the four ironclads are sent North into the canal system supplying the Army of God. After Merlin surreptitiously eliminates 5 crucial signal stations along the canals, the 4 ironclads, dragging several thousand troops behind them, proceed to eliminate every lock on the canal system. One of them shows up in the rear of the Church forces besieging the Sylmahn gap and destroys a large amount of their supplies while suffering few casualties. The entire operation hamstrings the Church's logistics, forcing them to stop their offensive until the locks can be rebuilt. In the Temple, the Grand Inquisitor is furious over this turn of events and attempts to lay the blame upon the Army of God's incompetence. However, Vicar Allayn Maigwair, the Church's Captain-General, manages to stand up to Clyntahn at last, while Vicar Rhobair Duchairn, the Church Treasurer manages to preserve the peace within the Group of Four (barely). Though the situation stabilizes for the Charis and Siddarmark, Merlin remains troubled by his sense of guilt over all the death and destruction his activities have caused. Nahrmahn manages to console him that he truly had no choice, and that with him, they at least have a chance to win.

== Reception ==
The book was nominated for the 2013 Prometheus Award.

== Editions ==
The book was translated to several languages, including German and Polish.

=== Audiobook ===
Like the previous novels, Midst Toil and Tribulation has been published in an unabridged audiobook version.
