= Off Armageddon Reef =

2007 novel by David Weber

- Author: David Weber
- Illustrator: Ellisa Mitchell (maps)
- Cover artist: Stephen Youll
- Language: English
- Genre: Science fiction
- Publisher: Tor Books
- Publication date: January 9, 2007
- Publication place: United States
- Media type: Print (hardcover)
- Pages: 608
- ISBN: 0-7653-1500-9
- OCLC: 70867041
- Dewey Decimal: 813/.54 22
- LC Class: PS3573.E217 O35 2007
- Followed by: By Schism Rent Asunder

Off Armageddon Reef is a science fiction novel by American author David Weber, published by Tor Books. It is the first book in the open-ended Safehold series. It follows a group of survivors who have settled a planet they name Safehold, a place where they had sought to escape from a terrible war, but that becomes the scene of a new struggle to uphold the principles of human civilization.

== Plot summary ==
In the 24th century, 8 million people flee to distant Safehold after barely escaping from the destruction of civilization by a genocidal alien foe, the Gbaba. Because the enemy tracked signs of advanced technology to hunt down other emergency colonies, the plan is to enforce a pre-industrial society until the danger passes. Administrator Eric Langhorne, a megalomaniac and neo-Luddite, instead has the colonists' memories erased and replaced with the belief they are the first humans, "Adams" and "Eves," the creations of God upon Safehold with "Archangel Langhorne" anointed as prophet and leader of the Church of God Awaiting.

Only by proscribing science as heretical, Langhorne believes, can humanity's safety be assured. Beyond opposing his madness on moral grounds, Pei Shan-Wei holds that eventually Langhorne's religion will collapse, leaving humanity defenseless as it returns to the stars with no memory of the past. Defying Langhorne, she sets up Alexandria, a refuge for knowledge on Safehold's southernmost continent. Tensions rise, before Alexandria is destroyed from space by a hidden kinetic bombardment platform. A retaliatory strike kills Langhorne and many of his followers, but the church remains.

Langhorne is established as a Christ-like martyr, while Shan-Wei is demonized, their names becoming common expressions of praise and dismay. The ruined land of Alexandria is cursed as Armageddon Reef. Yet Shan-Wei had a backup plan: the immortal cybernetic avatar of one of the Terran Federation's young military officers, Nimue Alban, who gave her life to allow the Safehold colonists to escape the Solar System. Secreted for centuries away in caverns full of weapons and technology, Nimue awakens, learns of what has transpired, and vows to guide humanity until it is ready to face the Gbaba.

Nimue adopts the traits of a man, Merlin Athrawes, so she is better suited to lead in patriarchal Safehold. Merlin resolves to pose as a gifted individual, rather than another "angel" making "miracles" with technology. He plans to slowly undermine the church with its own flaws, as represented by a dominant cabal of corrupt prelates, the Group of Four. Merlin chooses the most progressive of the various nations that govern in the church's name, the island Kingdom of Charis, as a host for a "virus" of innovation. He gains King Haarahld's trust by saving his son, Cayleb, from a team of assassins, before uncovering a dangerous plan for a coup.

Merlin inspires the seafaring Charisians to build an industrial economy, an advanced fleet of ships of the line and a nascent scientific establishment. He bonds deeply with the Ahrmahks, who govern with the support of a cadre of brilliant, noble lieutenants and an elected parliament, while evading questions about his true nature. The church, based in the "holy city" of Zion, which takes months to reach by sea from Charis, stews in suspicion and jealousy. Though repeat efforts to undermine Haarahld and uncover his "heresy" are for naught, the Group of Four eventually orders every naval power of Safehold to attack Charis anyway.

Merlin uses his space-age information gathering capabilities to predict the invasion and pinpoint enemy locations, allowing Cayleb, Merlin and the new-model Royal Charisian Navy to annihilate half of the enemy force off Armageddon Reef in a surprise attack. However, the less-capable diversion force led by Haarahld is forced into battle, and the king falls before Cayleb's fleet can intervene. The conflict destroys the ability of every Charisian rival to make war at sea, but leaves King Cayleb's people to stand alone against a ruthless church that commands the devotion of nearly every human alive.

== Theme ==
Through the novel, Weber uses the conflict between technology and religion to explore the ability of people and cultures to make choices, rather than have the choice made for them. Weber himself has stated in an interview that the novel was not an attack on organized religion, but more "about the use of any ideology or belief structure to manipulate, control and coerce". It is this concept of control to prevent the right, ability and responsibility to make choices forms the thematic backbone of the novel.

In many ways this book is about the human condition at its core, set in a future world of high and low technology. It highlights how the choices individuals make on a day-to-day basis, as well as the relationships we build define the character and quality of our lives. Classic, and often interesting, themes such as 1) the ability of money and power to corrupt otherwise "good" individuals, 2) the influence of duty and morals in relation to the good of the "many", 3) the power of faith and its tension with orthodoxy, 4) the importance of truth balanced with the need for secrecy, 5) the drive for human innovation and progress, 6) the hopeful human will to survive, even in the face of overwhelming odds, 7) the separation of church and state, and 8) the tension of whether the "ends" truly justify the "means".

== Concept and creation ==
Author David Weber says he was setting out to create a series in which high technology fused with "the feel of a 'last defender of elfland', but without the urban fantasy matrix"; the cybernetic protagonist who is unsure of his own humanity "grew naturally for me out of that initial basic premise." Weber explains that like many of his novels, the meat of the novel grew from questions such as "What set of circumstances could create a situation in which my PICA hero (Personality Integrated Cybernetic Avatar) came into existence? And given those circumstances, and the personality of Nimue Alban, how was 'Merlin' going to react?" As Weber puts it, "The lead character, Nimue, is a brilliant tactical officer, only about 27 years old at the time of her biological death, and has never known a time when humanity wasn't fighting a losing battle for its very existence." She awakens, in the body of an android, 800 years after her death, into a world which has retreated nearly completely into tyranny and ignorance. Even with magnificent technological resources, how in the world is she going to make things better?

The concept of the technologically superior Gbaba aliens, determined to exterminate all life forms that could be a threat to them, resembles the Achuultani aliens from Weber's earlier novel Mutineers' Moon, the first novel in his Empire from the Ashes trilogy. Furthermore, the plot of the third novel in that trilogy, Heirs of Empire, involves a small group of people with high technology using their knowledge of military weapons and tactics to assist a group of humans living on a world of low technology. This resembles how on the planet Safehold the character Merlin assists the Charisians in their struggle with the Church and its allies. Even the names Charis and Ahrmahk are recycled from "Heirs of Empire".

== Reception and reviews ==
Off Armageddon Reef was a cumulative bestseller, entering the New York Times Best Seller list at number 33. It was listed by Booklist as one of the top ten SF audiobooks of 2008 (read by Oliver Wyman) and was nominated in 2009 for the Arthur C. Clarke Award for best science fiction novel published in the United Kingdom as well as for the 2008 Prometheus Award.

Eric Brown writing for The Guardian in 2008 found Off Armageddon Reef to have a predictable ending and called the character development "perfunctory", but applauded Weber's pacing and vision.

Donald Jacob Uitvlugt reviewed the first two books in the series for Ray Gun Revival in January 2009, writing that "The concept of this series is a very clever one" as it allows the author to "play with the best fantasy tropes in an SFnal world", creating "an almost perfect blend of science fiction and fantasy". Uitvlugt also praised Weber for creating "well developed characters" and an "epic series" that he compared to "George R.R. Martin's Song of Ice and Fire without the relentless, depressing plot".

The book also received reviews in:

- in The New York Review of Science Fiction in September 2007, by David Mead (2007)
- in Holland-SF 2009, #1 in by Tessel M. Bauduin (in Dutch)
- in Galaxy's Edge, Issue 19: March 2016, by Bill Fawcett and Jody Lynn Nye
- in Poltergeist in 2010 by Bartosz Szczyżański (in Polish)
- in Fahrenheit in January 2011 by Jacek Falejczyk (in Polish) and in October 2012 by Daniel Ostrowski
- in Paradoks in 2012 by Jakub Mróz (in Polish)

== Notes ==
Unlike the following four books, the title of Off Armageddon Reef does not come from a hymn. Instead, the title refers to one of the battles in the book, as well as a location that is central to the series' backstory.

== Editions ==
The book was translated to several languages, including German, French, Japanese and Polish.

=== Audiobook (Book on CD) ===
- The reader of the Audiobook version of both Off Armageddon Reef and By Schism Rent Asunder was Oliver Wyman. The reader was switched to Jason Culp for both By Heresies Distressed and A Mighty Fortress.
