= Beth Cato =

American author (born 1980)

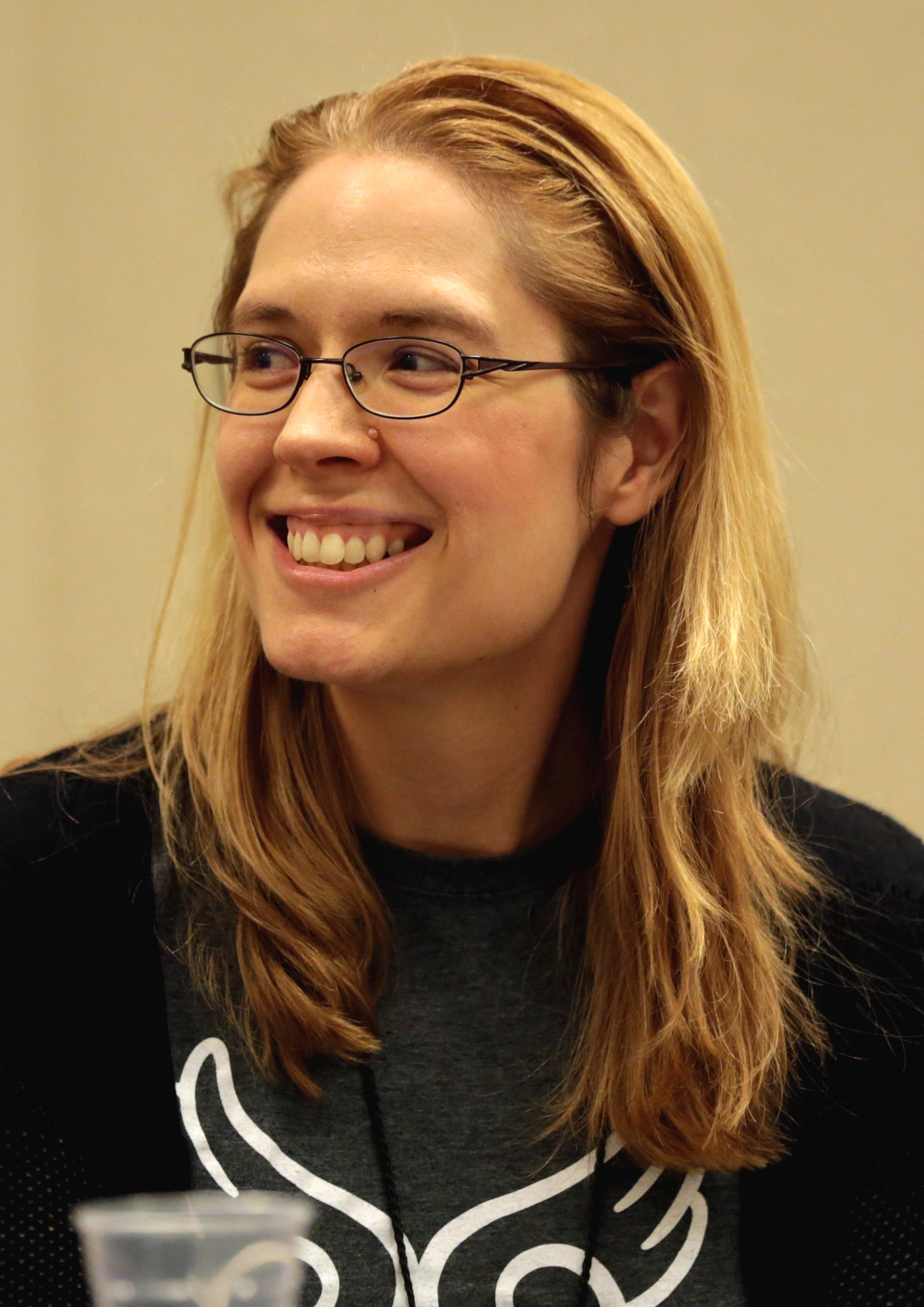
- Beth Cato in 2017
- Born: Beth Louise Davis; January 13, 1980 (age 46); Hanford, California, U.S.
- Occupations: Author, poet
- Writing career
- Genre: speculative fiction
- Website: www.bethcato.com

Beth Cato (born on January 13, 1980) is an American speculative fiction writer and poet, best known for her Clockwork Dagger and Blood of Earth series. She usually writes as Beth Cato, though in one instance she used the byline Beth L. Cato.

== Biography ==
Cato was born Beth Louise Davis on January 13, 1980 in Hanford, California. She married Navy sailor Jason Cato in 2000; in the course of his naval career they traveled the country, living at various times in South Carolina and Washington. They settled in Arizona after Jason left the Navy, where they lived in Buckeye, near Phoenix, with their son and two cats. They have since moved to Red Wing, MN.

== Literary career ==
Cato's first published fiction appeared online at Ligonier Valley Writers (lvwonline.org) in 2009. Her fiction has appeared in various periodicals, podcasts and anthologies, including A is for Apocalypse, At Year's End: Holiday SFF Stories, B is for Broken, Beneath Ceaseless Skies, Blue Shift, C is for Chimera, Cast of Wonders, Cats in Space, Clockwork Phoenix 5, Coffee: 14 Caffeinated Tales of the Fantastic, Crossed Genres, Cucurbital 3, D is for Dinosaur, Daily Science Fiction, Decision Points, E is for Evil, Electric Spec, Escape Pod, Every Day Fiction, F is for Fairy, Fae, Fantastic Stories of the Imagination, Fantastique Unfettered #3, Fantasy Scroll Magazine, Far-Fetched Fables, Fireside Magazine, Fireside Quarterly, Future Science Fiction Digest, Futures, Galactic Games, Giftmas 2018 Advent Anthology, Kasma Magazine, Little Green Men—Attack!, Mountain Magic, Mysterion, Nature, Not Just Rockets and Robots, Oomph: A Little Super Goes a Long Way, Orson Scott Card's InterGalactic Medicine Show, The Overcast, The Pedestal Magazine, Penumbra, Perihelion, PodCastle, Rocket Dragons Ignite, Science Fiction Short Stories, Spektrum der Wissenschaft, StarShipSofa, Stupefying Stories, Surviving Tomorrow, Swords and Steam Short Stories, Toasted Cake, 2016 Young Explorer's Adventure Guide, The 2021 Rhysling Anthology: The Best Science Fiction, Fantasy, & Horror Poetry of 2020, Uncanny Magazine, Uncle John's Bathroom Reader presents Flush Fiction, Utopia Science Fiction, Waylines, Year Five, and Year's Best YA Speculative Fiction 2013.

Some of her stories have been translated into Arabic, Chinese, German and Persian.

== Recognition ==
Cato's fiction and poetry has been nominated for a number of literary awards, and in one instance won. The Clockwork Dagger placed fifth in the 2015 Locus Poll Award for Best First Novel. Wings of Sorrow and Bone was nominated for the 2016 Nebula Award for Best Novella. "Fried Okra" was a preliminary nominee for the 2016 Rhysling Award for Best Short Poem. "The Box of Dust and Monsters" placed third in the 2017 Rhysling Award for Best Short Poem. "The Death of the Horse" and "Morning During Migration Season" were both preliminary nominees for the 2017 Rhysling Award for Best Long Poem. Breath of Earth placed nineteenth in the 2017 Locus Poll Award for Best Fantasy Novel and was nominated for the 2017 Dragon Award for Best Alternate History Novel. "A Net to Snare a Unicorn" and "Wayfaring King" were both finalists for the 2018 Rhysling Award for Best Short Poem. "The Library is Open" was a preliminary nominee for the 2018 BSFA Award for Best Short Fiction. "After Her Brother Ripped the Heads from Her Paper Dolls" won the 2019 Rhysling Award for Best Short Poem.

== Bibliography ==
=== The Clockwork Dagger series ===
- The Deepest Poison (novelette ) (2015)
- The Clockwork Dagger (2014)
- The Clockwork Crown (2015)
- Wings of Sorrow and Bone (novella) (2015)
- Final Flight (novelette ) (2016)
- Deep Roots (collection) (2016)

=== Blood of Earth series ===
1. Breath of Earth (2016)
2. Call of Fire (2017)
3. Roar of Sky (2018)

=== Chefs of the Five Gods series ===
1. A Thousand Recipes for Revenge (2023)
2. A Feast for Starving Stone (2024)

=== Cheese Boards by Bird cozy mystery series ===
- Cheddar Luck Next Time (2025)

=== Stand-alone novel ===
- A House Between Sea and Sky (2025)

=== Collection ===
- Red Dust and Dancing Horses: and Other Stories (2017)

=== Short fiction ===
- "Brains for Breakfast" (2009)
- "Promise in the Dust" (2009)
- "Biding Time" (2009)
- "Bless This House" (2010)
- "A Recipe for Rain and Rainbows" (2010)
- "Reading Time" (2011)
- "A Dance to End Our Final Day" (2011)
- "La Rosa Still in Bloom" (2011)
- "A Spectacular Display" (2011)
- "Red Dust and Dancing Horses" (2012)
- "213 Myrtle Street" (2012)
- "Cartographer's Ink" (2012)
- "Blue Tag Sale" (2012)
- "Toilet Gnomes at War" (2012)
- "Overlap" (2012)
- "A Unicorn for Christmas" (2012)
- "An Echo in the Shell" (2013)
- "Maps" (2013)
- "American Shadow" (2013)
- "Homecoming" (2013)
- "Canopy of Skulls" (2013)
- "A Lonesome Speck of Home" (2013)
- "Clementine, Who Swims with Mermaids" (2013)
- "For Want of Stars" (2013)
- "The Sweetness of Bitter" (2013)
- "Hat Trick" (2013)
- "Stitched Wings" (2013)
- "The Cartography of Shattered Trees" (2014)
- "Measures and Countermeasures" (2014)
- "D" (2014)
- "Post-Apocalyptic Conversations with a Sidewalk" (2014)
- "Hatchlings" (2014)
- "A Mother's Touch" (2014)
- "My Brother's Keeper" (2015)
- "From the Ashes" (2015)
- "Bread of Life" (2015)
- "Roots, Shallow and Deep" (2015)
- "K" (2015)
- "Headspace" (2015)
- "The Quest You Have Chosen Defies Your Fate" (2015)
- "Beat Softly, My Wings of Steel" (2016)
- "The Human Is Late to Feed the Cat" (2016)
- "The Souls of Horses" (2016)
- "S" (2016)
- "Bear-bear Speaks" (2016)
- "Minor Hockey Gods of Barstow Station" (2016)
- "Moon Skin" (2016)
- "10 Things Newly Manifested Wizards Should Never Do" (2016)
- "Left Hand Awakens" (2017)
- "P" (2017)
- "With Cardamom I'll Bind Their Lips" (2017)
- "A Fine Night for Tea and Bludgeoning" (2017) [also as by Beth L. Cato]
- "Excerpts from the 100-Day Food Diary of Angela Meyer" (2017)
- "So You Have Been Claimed by a Magical Cat" (2017)
- "Powers of Observation" (2017)
- "The Library Is Open" (2018)
- "R" (2018)
- "To This You Cling, with Jagged Fingernails" (2018)
- "The 133rd Live Podcast of the Gourmando Resistance" (2018)
- "Rootless" (2018)
- "The Blighted Godling of Company Town H" (2019)
- "The Peculiar Gravity of Home" (2019)
- "A Picture Is Worth" (2019)
- "Consider the Monsters" (2019)
- "Z" (2019)
- "Clouds Gleam Across Her Eyes" (2019)
- "The Wind Knows All" (2019)
- "Sometimes You End Up Where You Are" (2019)
- "A Royal Saber's Work is Never Done" (2020)
- "Perilous Blooms" (2020)
- "A Different Heaven" (2020)
- "Apocalypse Playlist" (2020)
- "A Consideration of Trees" (2020)
- "A Future of Towers Made" (2021)
- "What Friends Are For" (2021)
- "Shared Pain" (2021)
- "Your Cat" (2021)
- "Welcome Home" (2021)
- "The Recipe Keeper" (2022)
- "More Than Nine" (2022)
- "How to Hide a Unicorn" (2022)
- "The Right Cornbread" (2022)
- "To Meet the Death Carriage" (2022)
- "How to Creatively Host Cheese Parties During and After the Apocalypse" (2022)
- "The 207th Time I Went Back to March 9, 1980" (2022)
- "A Light in the Garden" (2022)
- "Family Get-Together" (2022)

=== Verse ===
- "Alone" (with Arnold Emmanuel, Jennie Glenn, Karl Louderback, Rhonda Parrish, Pete Pfau, Clare Revell and Ray Smith) (2010)
- "Ever Do They Hunger" (2011)
- "Hearts" (2011)
- "In Buckeye" (2011)
- "Six Months After" (2012)
- "A Hairy Issue" (2013)
- "Mice" (2013)
- "The Truth about Unicorns" (2013)
- "What Remains" (2013)
- "Cat Lady" (2013)
- "The Truth About Fairies" (2013)
- "Four Addenda to Home Owner Association Rules" (2013)
- "Regarding Portable Unicorns" (2013)
- "What We Carry" (2013)
- "Worst Enemy" (2013)
- "Hunter" (2013)
- "Mad Scientist's Lament" (2014)
- "Rest Day, in Transit to Centauri Prime" (2014)
- "Seeds" (2014)
- "Time Traveler's Woe" (2014)
- "Cloud Catcher" (2014)
- "Bird Girl" (2014)
- "Authentic Mother Version 2.6" (2014)
- "Barstow" (2014)
- "Cogs" (2014)
- "Nisei" (2014)
- "Unanimous" (2014)
- "Quercus California" (2014)
- "Advice on Befriending a Siren" (2014)
- "Mama Bogey's Advice for Her Young's First Closet" (2014)
- "The Time Traveler's Buttonhook" (2014)
- "The Time Traveler's Gratitude" (2014)
- "The Time Traveler's Pants" (2014)
- "Suddenly, a Unicorn" (2014)
- "Dragon to Centauri" (2014)
- "To Walk Upon Clouds" (2014)
- "From Grandma, With Love" (2014)
- "Thank Hecate for Insurance" (2014)
- "Time Traveler's Seance" (2014)
- "How a Modern Green Man Grows" (2014)
- "Loophole" (2015)
- "Squished Things" (2015)
- "The Border Cowboy in Fairyland" (2015)
- "The Border Cowboy's Smile" (2015)
- "The Time Traveler's Diagnosis" (2015)
- "Mama Gonna Fight" (2015)
- "After" (2015)
- "The Selkie Visits the Beach" (2015)
- "Genetic" (2015)
- "The Border Cowboy's Horse" (2015)
- "The Time Traveler's Illness" (2015)
- "The Migration of Winged Jukeboxes" (2015)
- "What Happened Among the Stars" (2015)
- "The Time Traveler Revisits Childhood" (2015)
- "Fried Okra" (2015)
- "Obsidian" (2015)
- "The City" (2015)
- "Why You Will Listen and Drown" (2015)
- "Hera Herself, at 8'clock Tonight" (2015)
- "Riders of the Apocalypse: Death" (2015)
- "A Warning, Flashing in Red Overlaid on Your Visor" (2016)
- "The Box of Dust and Monsters" (2016)
- "Apology Letter from the Aliens" (2016)
- "No more Broomsticks for Me" (2016)
- "To Ride the Puca" (2016)
- "Window View" (2016)
- "Dragon, Bound in Stone" (2016)
- "View from Above" (2016)
- "Deeper Than Pie" (2016)
- "A Sip of Starlight" (2016)
- "Footprints" (2016)
- "Shopping Spree" (2016)
- "Keep This Mystery" (2016)
- "The Mermaid, on Display in Phoenix" (2016)
- "The Death of the Horse" (2016)
- "Horse and Girl" (2016)
- "Lamp Beside the Golden Door" (2016)
- "Morning During Migration Season" (2016)
- "At the Very Least" (2016)
- "A Net to Snare a Unicorn" (2017)
- "Being Human" (2017)
- "Preventative Measures" (2017)
- "The Flesh is Weak" (2017)
- "Final Portion of Elixir Recipe" (2017)
- "No Upgrade Required" (2017)
- "Note on the Teachers' Lounge Fridge at the Witches' Academy" (2017)
- "When Stones Awaken" (2017)
- "A Net to Snare Pegasus" (2017)
- "Homes" (2017)
- "The Astronaut's Cat" (2017)
- "Wayfaring King" (2017)
- "Call Me Home Again, Child" (2017)
- "The Stars Sing" (2018)
- "After Her Brother Ripped the Heads from Her Paper Dolls" (2018)
- "This Body Made" (2018)
- "The Fairies in the Crawlspace" (2018)
- "So Old" (2018)
- "The Border Cowboy at the Border" (2018)
- "'a GoFundMe account'" (2018)
- "Gone" (2018)
- "Maybe Tomorrow" (2018)
- "Prehistoric Provisions" (2018)
- "smile" (2018)
- "What You Hear When Your Best Friend Falls for a Supervillain" (2019)
- "Childhood Memory from the Old Victorian House on Warner" (2019)
- "Consequences of a Stolen Star" (2019)
- "My Ghost Will Know the Way" (2019)
- "Stranger Danger" (2019)
- "Old Coyote" (2019)
- "Tree in Drought" (2019)
- "Moon Catcher" (2019)
- "Mrs. Housekeeper" (2020)
- "Other Worlds to Save" (2020)
- "he scores" (with Rhonda Parrish) (2020)
- "The Girl Who Survived" (2020)
- "I Make Myself a Dragon" (2020)
- "Great-Great Grandmother's Recipe" (2020)
- "Going Home" (2020)
- "The Luck Eaters" (with Rhonda Parrish) (2020)
- "When the Company Pays" (2020)
- "The Way Is Long and Fraught with Perils" (2020)
- "A Spider's Love" (2020)
- "Don't Panic" (2020)
- "Maiden Voyage of the Penelope" (2020)
- "My Cat, He" (2020)
- "At the End" (2020)
- "Least Weird Thing of All" (2020)
- "Space Isn't Like the Vids" (2020)
- "Express Your Feelings" (2020)
- "Dollies" (2021)
- "mansplainer" (2021)
- "Outcomes of Her Time Travel Efforts to Save Her Husband" (2021)
- "Under Tables" (2021)
- "How to Find Yourself Again" (2021)
- "Out of All the Experiences" (2021)
- "Demons" (2021)
- "Follow the Meandering Path" (2021)
- "The Eye of the Kraken" (2021)
- "But You Mustn't Look Back" (with Rhonda Parrish) (2021)
- "Field Trip to See the Mermaid" (2021)
- "Shapeshifting Isn't Some Party Trick" (2021)
- "The Bookstore" (2021)
- "Let's Enjoy the Stars One Last Time" (2022)
- "Today"(2022)
- "Forget That" (2022)
- "Timeless Pie" (2022)
- "The Ship Is Wrong" (2022)
- "Doing Her Part to Combat Sexism in the Sciences" (2022)
- "In Spring, We Thanked the Wee Folk" (2022)
- "Mother, Grandmother, God" (2022)
- "Only Times" (2022)
- "When, as an Adult, You Choose to Again Believe in Magic" (2022)
- "Better Off" (2022)
- "That Monster Beneath the Bed" (2022)
- "Following the White Horse" (2022)
- "Birthday Cake" (with Rhonda Parrish) (2023)
- "The Nothings" (with Rhonda Parrish) (2023)
- "The Lying Moon" (2023)
- “The Sound, The Sound, The Sound”(with Rhonda Parrish) (2024)
- “Not Waste a Drop” (with Rhonda Parrish) (2024)
- “Her Favourite” (with Rhonda Parrish)
