= 12 Tiny Christmas Tales =

- Promotional poster for TV special
- Genre: Christmas; Musical; Comedy
- Created by: Bill Plympton
- Directed by: Bill Plympton
- Voices of: Madelon Thomas; Billy Schneider; Madeline Rogan; Peter Dylan Rogan; Pete Zarustica; Tony Carroll; Rebecca Honig; Sheldonna Smythe; Bill Plympton and Maureen McElheron (additionals)
- Composer: Maureen McElheron
- Country of origin: United States
- Original language: English

Production
- Cinematography: John Donnelly
- Editor: Anthony Arcidi
- Running time: 22 minutes
- Production company: Plymptoons Studio Productions

Original release
- Network: Cartoon Network
- Release: December 7, 2001

12 Tiny Christmas Tales (stylized onscreen as 12 tiny Christmas tales) is an American Christmas animated short film that was broadcast on Cartoon Network on December 7, 2001. This project was animated and directed by Bill Plympton and Inspired by Christmas cards that Plympton began drawing for his parents in 1964.

== Plot ==
It's the night of Christmas Eve. A grandmother and her three grandchildren are relaxing all cozy beside a fireplace in the living room. As it gets late, the grandmother tells her grandchildren that it's time for bed. However, the children do not want to go to bed without a story. After mistaking a cookbook for a holiday book, the grandmother selects the correct book and tells heartwarming, albeit bizarre, tales of Christmas.

=== Segments ===
The stories are based on eight-panel sequences.

- Victor the Tree

When Victor was young, his mother told him if he was a good tree and grew straight, he would be chosen as the village square tree. So, little tree Victor grew big and straight, which would guarantee to make him become the village square tree. A lumberjack comes by and saws him down, but a tree spirit appears and takes Victor to the village square and everyone is happy.

- Cecil the Snowman

A boy builds Cecil the snowman and a girl neighbor builds a snow girl - both boy and girl dislike each other and run inside crying. Cecil and the snow girl come alive. Cecil fell in love with the snow girl, but they were separated by a snow fissure. That did not stop Cecil: he jumped all the way to the other side of the snow to be with his love and lived happily ever after. The boy and girl who built Cecil and the snow girl, respectively, see them together the next morning and make amends.

- Blitzen

Blitzen, the reindeer, was telling jokes at the North Pole to his friends. Meanwhile, he was imagining himself in Las Vegas being famous for telling jokes. After his comedy routine is poorly received, Santa Claus arrives and takes Blitzen home to the North Pole since he appreciates the reindeer's jokes.

- The 12 Days of Christmas

Accompanied by the song of the same name, a lady opens the door and receives many different types of birds as gifts from her true love as the days pass. In the end, she gets tired of having the birds around and cooks them and has dinner with the man.

- A Little Veggie Christmas

A small vegetable in the market was excited about Christmas, but her fellow vegetables are not - they tell of bad things that happen to them as they are turned into meals. Nervous and frightened, the small vegetable is then bought by an old lady and taken home; instead of being turned into a meal, it is placed above a door as a mistletoe decoration, and watches touched when a man and woman kiss each other.

- The Killer Snowflake

Old Bob went for a walk in the night but went missing the next morning. The next night, widow Hadley went shopping and did not return. A trap was set, and the killer, revealed to be a snowflake, was trapped and taken to court. His crystallized tears were turned into a very beautiful snowflake. He fell in love and moved into a house in the woods.

- Lester the Tie

A colorful tie named Lester wants to be selected and worn, but the other ties dismiss him since he looks outrageous. He was chosen by a girl in the store, who gave it to his father as a Christmas present. Her dad, however, returned the tie since it looked strange. But then her daughter went back to get the tie and used it as a wreath crown's bow. Lester is glad.

- The Dancing Bear and the King

The kingdom was sad because the king was sad during the holiday season. He was not able to get the holiday spirit, even costumes did not work. So the village got a dancing bear for the circus to make the king happy, and he finally did.

- The Boy Who Loved Christmas

Eugene the boy loved Christmas on all the seasons: Valentine's Day, Easter, Independence Day, Halloween and Thanksgiving. He always went around with his Santa Claus Christmas costume and sang "Jingle Bells". On Christmas Day, three carolers are singing the song when Eugene arrives... wearing a skeleton costume and saying "Trick or Treat!"

- The Peddler and the Donkey

Long ago, a peddler was traveling with his horse pulling the carriage. A “crazy local dog” scared the two, and they ran away. They hit a bump and took off into the sky, with the peddler's items falling off to people below, and they accepted them as gifts. He is later revealed to be the origin of Santa Claus.

- The Plucky Present

An animated present falls off from Santa Claus's bag. The animated present tries to find his destination, which he believes is Jimmy's house. After avoiding numerous obstacles from cars and a dog, he arrives at Jimmy's house. Inside the present, however, is a girl's dress - the present misreads his tag and learns he was originally to be sent to Jenny's house. The plucky present takes off once again to be with Jenny.

- The Carolers

A man was trying to sing, but a dog was interrupting him howling, so the man demanded the dog leave. The dog howls around a corner and gains an audience. After seeing the dog get applauded, the man decided to come closer to the dog and join the dog by singing.

After the grandchildren are taken to bed and fall asleep, the grandmother leaves their bedroom, and her shadow transforms into Santa Claus and says, "Ho! Ho! Ho!"

== Cast ==
- Madelon Thomas as Grandma
- Billy Schneider as Older Boy
- Madeline Rogan as Little Girl
- Peter Dylan Rogan as Younger Boy
- Oliver Wyman as Blitzen / Angry Guy (credited as Pete Zarustica)
- Tony Carroll as Plucky Present / Lester the Tie / Announcer / Santa Claus / Dad
- Rebecca Honig as Veggies
- Sheldonna Smythe as Little Girl (Lester the Tie)

=== Additional voices ===
- Bill Plympton
- Maureen McElheron

== Songs ==
In this film there are nine original songs, which were written and executive-produced by Maureen McElheron. Hank Bones instead served as a producer. Finally, "Kalinka" was the only famous song inserted into it.

1. "Cecil the Snowman"
2. "Remember Christmas"
3. "Victor the Tree"
4. "Blitzen's Theme"
5. "Everyday's a Holiday"
6. "Donkey and Peddler"
7. "Plucky Present"
8. "Killer Snowflake"
9. "Veggie Christmas"
10. "Kalinka" (traditional version)

== Credits ==
- Animated & Directed by: Bill Plympton
- Camera: John Donnelly
- Editor: Anthony Arcidi
- Sound: Georgia Hilton
- Associate Producers: Maureen McElheron and John Holderried
- Music Producer: Hank Bones
- Art Supervisor: Signe Baumane
- Artists: Jesse Schmal, Andrea Breitman, Sasha Vetrov, Lori Samsel, Celia Bullwinkel, Rose Bevans
- Voices: Madelon Thomas, Billy Schneider, Madeline Rogan, Peter Dylan Rogan, Pete Zarustica, Tony Carroll, Rebecca Honig, Sheldonna Smythe, Bill Plympton, Maureen McElheron
- Plymptoons

== See also ==
- List of Christmas films

== Bibliography ==
- 12 tiny Christmas tales
