= The Boy Who Would Live Forever =

2004 science fiction novel by Frederik Pohl

- First edition (publ. Tor Books); Cover art by John Harris
- Author: Frederik Pohl
- Language: English
- Publisher: Tor
- Publication date: 2004
- ISBN: 0-7653-1049-X (first edition)
- Dewey Decimal: 813.6
- LC Class: PS3566.O36 B69

The Boy Who Would Live Forever is a science fiction novel by American writer Frederik Pohl. It was published in 2004 by Tor. It is about intrigues involving one of Pohl's recurring creations, the Heechee universe. The Heechee are a fictional alien race which developed advanced technologies, including interstellar space travel, but then disappeared. In the novel, humans use abandoned Heechee starships to explore space, while the Heechee aliens hide from a mysterious foe, the Kugel, in a black hole, all the while pursued by hate-crazed humans who are Heechee hunters.

== Plot ==
The Heechee alien race developed advanced technologies, including spaceships, which have been found by humans, though people cannot figure out how the technologies work. At the Gateway asteroid, humans found many Heechee spaceships which had preprogrammed destinations. People tried to figure out how to change their destinations, but the Heechee technologies were not understood at all. As such, when explorers set out on the preprogrammed Heechee ships, they might find themselves going to a lethal dead end, or they might end up discovering a valuable new location. Two young explorers, Stan Avery and Estrella Pancorbo, set out on a preprogrammed Heechee ship, but they do not discover anything valuable. They set out towards a black hole where the Heechee are hiding to escape from the "Foe", a dangerous type of being also known as Kugel.

A Heechee called "Achiever" tries to figure out what the Kugel are doing. Meanwhile, a wealthy human named Gelle-Klara Moynlin uses sophisticated Heechee tools to watch the Crab Nebula expand. Another wealthy human, Wan Enrique Santos-Smith has a crazed hatred of the Heechee. Wan tries to think of ways to kill all of the Heechee. Another human who hates the Heechee, Reverend Orbis McClune, has died, but the electronically-stored version of McClune has been purchased by Wan. McClune is torn between assisting the obviously deranged Wan or trying to stop him. In another subplot, an artificial intelligence named Marc Anthony roves through the galaxy monitoring the Kugel and Wan.

== Reception ==
Kirkus Reviews calls it an "...astonishing eyeful, rich and absorbing, albeit undramatic, leaving scope for at least one more installment", and refers to it as "...a feast for Gateway travelers" (a reference to the Gateway in the 1977 Pohl novel of the same name; the Gateway is a hollowed-out asteroid serving as a space station where human space explorers find alien technologies).
