= Heechee Saga =

Science fiction novel series by Frederik Pohl

- Author: Frederik Pohl
- Country: United States
- Genre: Science fiction

The Heechee Saga, also known as the Gateway series, is a series of science fiction novels and short stories by Frederik Pohl. The Heechee are an advanced alien race that visited the Solar System hundreds of millennia ago and then mysteriously disappeared. They left behind bases containing artifacts, including working starships, which are discovered and exploited by humanity.

== Plot overview ==
A prospector on Venus finds an abandoned Heechee spaceship and launches it, with himself aboard. The ship automatically returns to a hollowed out asteroid within the Solar System, later named Gateway. Before he dies from lack of food and water, he manages to signal the rest of humanity his location. On Gateway is a priceless treasure: nearly a thousand small starships, many of them still functional. They come in three sizes, barely capable of carrying one, three or five passengers along with supplies.

The Gateway Corporation takes control of the asteroid on behalf of the United States of America, the Soviet Union, the New People's Asia, the Venusian Confederation, and the United States of Brazil. Through trial and error, they figure out how to use the ships, but not well enough to set the terminus and duration of a trip. Individuals and groups are allowed to depart on these ships, risking (and often losing) their lives in the hope of finding something at their unknown destination that will make them rich.

As the series progresses, humans are able to use and sometimes reverse engineer Heechee artifacts, including a working Heechee plant that converts simple elements into food.

== Publication history ==
The original Heechee novella, "The Merchants of Venus" (sometimes called "The Merchants of Venus Underground"), was published in the July–August 1972 issue of Worlds of If – or If, a magazine Pohl had edited from 1961 to 1969 – and almost simultaneously in The Gold at the Starbow's End (Ballantine Books, 1972), a collection of short fiction by Pohl. The 1972 magazine story was illustrated by Jack Gaughan.

Five novels published from 1977 to 2004 also feature the Heechee:

- Gateway. This was serialized in Galaxy beginning November 1976, with illustrations by Vincent DiFate, and was published as a book by St. Martin's Press in April 1977. Translations into French, German, Dutch, and Italian were all published during 1978 and 1979. (Note: ISFDB catalogs editions published in six foreign languages: French and German, 1978; Dutch and Italian, 1979; Portuguese, 1986; Hungarian, 1991.)
- Beyond the Blue Event Horizon (Del Rey, 1980)
- Heechee Rendezvous (Del Rey, 1984). It was serialized in Amazing Science Fiction starting in January 1984, with illustrations by Jack Gaughan.
- The Annals of the Heechee (Del Rey, 1987)
- The Boy Who Would Live Forever: A Novel of Gateway (Tor Books, 2004), which incorporated three previously published stories:

- "The Boy Who Would Live Forever" (split into "From Istanbul to the Stars" and "In the Steps of Heroes"), Far Horizons, ed. Robert Silverberg (Avon Books, May 1999), pp. 295–342
- "Hatching the Phoenix", illustrated by Vincent DiFate, Amazing Stories, Fall 1999, pp. 32–43, and Winter 2000, pp. 84–96
- "A Home for the Old Ones", Science Fiction: DAW 30th Anniversary (DAW Books, May 2002), pp. 159–74

In 1990, nine new short stories were published in the first three 1990 issues of Aboriginal Science Fiction. These, and "The Merchants of Venus", made up the collection, The Gateway Trip: Tales and Vignettes of the Heechee (Del Rey Books); both the serial and the book, also released in 1990, were illustrated by Frank Kelly Freas.

A German-language edition of the first three novels was published 20 years later as "The Gateway Trilogy": Die Gateway-Trilogie (Munich: Heyne Verlag, 2004).

== Other media ==
Gateway, a series of two video games, was released in 1992 and 1993 by Legend Entertainment.

On January 6, 2019; Skybound Entertainment announced that they have reached an agreement to option Frederik Pohl’s 1977 science fiction novel, Gateway. The deal includes all other volumes in the Heechee saga. Although without a time frame for it, Skybound plans to produce a TV series based on Gateway.

== Reception ==
Gateway, the first novel and second publication in the series, won four major awards as the year's best English-language speculative fiction or science fiction novel: (Note: ISFDB lists the annual John W. Campbell Memorial Award, Hugo Award, and Nebula Award—sometimes called the "triple crown", selected by a respected panel, by world fans, and by American writers respectively. It also lists the annual Locus Award for Best Novel, 8th place in the 1987 all-time poll of Locus readers (All-Time Best SF Novel), and 11th place in the comparable 1998 poll (All-Time Best SF Novel before 1990).) the 1978 Hugo Award for Best Novel, the 1978 Locus Award for Best Novel, the 1977 Nebula Award for Best Novel, and the 1978 John W. Campbell Memorial Award for Best Science Fiction Novel. Publishers Weekly stated that "Since it began with the novel Gateway (1977), Pohl's Heechee series has been among the most consistently daring of SF's continuing enterprises".
