= Every Day Fiction =

- Editor: Camille Gooderham Campbell
- Categories: Fiction, flash fiction
- Frequency: Daily
- Publisher: Every Day Publishing Ltd.
- Unpaid circulation: approx. 10,000 RSS/Email Subscribers / day + 25,000 unique visitors /month (as of Feb, 2011)
- First issue: September 1, 2007; 19 years ago
- Country: Canada
- Language: Canadian English
- Website: www.everydayfiction.com
- ISSN: 1918-1000

Every Day Fiction (ISSN 1918-1000), abbreviated EDF, is a Canadian flash fiction magazine founded in 2007 and published by Every Day Publishing Ltd. It is typically published on a daily schedule.

Every Day Fiction publishes flash fiction stories of all genres, and podcasts stories that have a high level of appeal with their readers. Additionally, they have published multiple Best of Every Day Fiction anthologies consisting of the 100 best stories appearing in the magazine for their respective years. In part because of its relatively large audience, EDF has placed highly in the Preditors & Editors Readers Choice Poll and in 2010 Shaun Simon's story "Snowman" won 1st place in its category.

In 2010, Every Day Fiction was listed by Writer's Digest as one of the 50 Best Online Literary Markets, and has been cited by numerous print sources including The Wall Street Journal, the Vancouver Sun, and the StarPhoenix.

== History ==
Every Day Fiction is notable for being one of the first online fiction magazines to abandon the print model that had been migrated onto the web by its contemporaries, and instead focus on a format in use by several major blogs—dynamic content published in high volume. A key component of the site has been its focus on social media, with readers being able to vote and comment on stories.

== Editors ==
- Jordan Lapp, Managing Editor 2007–2009, Executive Editor 2009–Present
- Camille Gooderham Campbell, Editor 2007–09, Managing Editor 2009–Present
- Elissa Vann Struth, Editor 2009–10
- Carol Clark, Editor 2010–Present
- J.C. Towler, Editor 2010–Present
- Joseph Kaufman, Editor 2011–Present

In 2009, founding editor Jordan Lapp won 1st place in Writers of the Future and announced that he would be retiring from the day-to-day operations of the magazine in order to focus on the magazine's parent company, Every Day Publishing Ltd, which has since launched or acquired three more magazines: Every Day Poets, Flash Fiction Chronicles, and Ray Gun Revival.

== Authors published in EDF ==
- Megan Arkenberg
- Jimmy Caputo
- Beth Cato
- P. Djèlí Clark
- Guy Anthony De Marco
- Kristi DeMeester
- Bosley Gravel
- Jerri Jerreat
- Ken Liu
- Ben Loory
- Kristine Ong Muslim
- Mark Noce
- Sarah Pinsker
- Cat Rambo
- Bruce Holland Rogers
- Ramon Rozas III
- Alex Z. Salinas
- Wayne Scheer
- Kevin Shamel
- Alex Shvartsman
- Shaun Simon
- E. Catherine Tobler
- James Van Pelt
- Damien Angelica Walters
- A. C. Wise
- Sylvia Spruck Wrigley
- William R. Stoddart
- Jacob Pérez
- Heather Dade (formerly Heather Kuehl)
- Derek McMillan

== See also ==
- List of literary magazines
- Science fiction magazine
- Fantasy fiction magazine
- Horror fiction magazine
- List of Canadian magazines
