= Red Dust and Dancing Horses: and Other Stories =

2017 collection of short stories by Beth Cato

- Cover of first edition
- Author: Beth Cato
- Cover artist: Kazuhiko Nakamura
- Language: English
- Genre: fantasy fiction
- Publisher: Fairwood Press
- Publication date: 2017
- Publication place: United States
- Media type: print (paperback), ebook
- Pages: 362
- ISBN: 978-1-933846-68-2
- OCLC: 1012131679

Red Dust and Dancing Horses: and Other Stories is a collection of science fiction and fantasy short stories and poems by American writer Beth Cato. It was first published in trade paperback by Fairwood Press and ebook by Baen Books in November 2017.

== Summary ==
The book collects twenty-eight short stories, six poems and an afterword by the author, together with an introduction by Arianne "Tex" Thompson

== Contents ==
- "Introduction" (Arianne "Tex" Thompson)
- Hoof Beats and Cat Whiskers
  - "The Souls of Horses" (from Clockwork Phoenix 5, Apr. 2016)
  - "What We Carry" (poem) (from Inkscrawl no. 6, Aug. 2013)
  - "Beat Softly, My Wings of Steel" (from PodCastle no. 405, Feb. 29, 2016)
  - "Hunter" (poem) (from Metastasis: An Anthology to Support Cancer Research, Oct. 2013)
  - "Headspace" (from Cats In Space, May 2015)
  - "The Death of the Horse" (poem) (from Remixt v. 1, iss. 8, Sep. 12, 2016)
  - "Red Dust and Dancing Horses" (from Stupefying Stories v. 1, no. 5, Mar. 2012)
  - "What Happened Among the Stars" (poem) (from Niteblade, Jun. 2015)
- Brothers, Mothers, Grandparents, and a Sentient House
  - "Biding Time" (from The Pedestal Magazine no. 55, 2009)
  - "Hat Trick" (from Oomph: A Little Super Goes a Long Way, Oct. 2013)
  - "Blue Tag Sale" (from Buzzy Mag, Sep. 7, 2012)
  - "Nisei" (poem) (from Mythic Delirium iss. 0.4, Apr./Jun. 2014)
  - "Toilet Gnomes at War" (from Stupefying Stories v. 2, no. 1, Nov. 2012)
  - "Minor Hockey Gods of Barstow Station" (from Galactic Games, Jun. 2016)
  - "An Echo in the Shell" (from Waylines no. 1, Jan. 2013)
  - "213 Myrtle Street" (from Flash Fiction Online, Apr. 2012)
- A Sample Pack of Apocalypses
  - "The Human Is Late to Feed the Cat" (from Nature v. 531, no. 7595, Mar. 24, 2016)
  - "The Sweetness of Bitter" (from Orson Scott Card's Intergalactic Medicine Show no. 35, Sep. 2013)
  - "Post-Apocalyptic Conversations with a Sidewalk" (from Nature v. 513, no. 7519, Sep. 25, 2014)
  - "A Dance to End Our Final Day" (from Every Day Fiction, May 8, 2011)
  - "A Lonesome Speck of Home" (from Blue Shift no. 1, May 2013)
  - "La Rosa Still in Bloom" (from Crossed Genres Quarterly 3, Sep. 15, 2011)
- Culinary Magic
  - "A Recipe for Rain and Rainbows" (from Mountain Magic: Spellbinding Tales of Appalachia, Oct. 2010)
  - "Bread of Life" (from Nature v. 520, no. 7546, Apr. 9, 2015)
  - "Stitched Wings" (from Beneath Ceaseless Skies no. 137, Dec. 26, 2013)
  - "My Brother's Keeper" (from Fantasy Scroll Magazine, Apr. 2015)
  - "Deeper Than Pie" (poem) (from Uncanny Magazine iss. 10, May/Jun. 2016)
- All Who Wander
  - "Maps" (from Daily Science Fiction, Feb. 2013)
  - "Overlap" (from Cucurbital 3, Nov. 2012)
  - "Moon Skin" (from Swords and Steam Short Stories, Sep. 2016)
  - "The Cartography of Shattered Trees" (from Fae, May 2014)
  - "Roots, Shallow and Deep" (from Urban Fantasy Magazine, May 2015)
  - "Cartographer's Ink" (from Daily Science Fiction, Aug. 2012)
  - "The Quest You Have Chosen Defies Your Fate" (from Daily Science Fiction, Aug. 2015)
- "Afterword"
- "About the Author"
- "Publication Notes"

== Reception ==
Publishers Weekly calls the book a "capable collection ... arranged thematically in five sections" with "a charming afterword" giving "a brief history of each work ... illuminating the write-submit-reject-revise struggle with a light and rueful honesty; a similar tone pervades the book." The reviewer notes that "[t]hough not every story is optimistic, the most memorable ones weave unpalatable truths ... with the sweetness that keeps life going. Hope is as incontrovertible as misery." Three pieces are highlighted as "standouts;" the title story, "Hat Trick" and "A Dance to End Our Final Day." Others, including Cato's "alternate Confederacy scenarios" like "The Souls of Horses," "may not land quite as originally intended." Still, the reviewer concludes that "on the whole, Cato hits her intended targets with compassion and insight," rating the book "suitable for YA and adult audiences alike."
