= ConClave (convention) =

Convention in Michigan, US

- Genre: Science Fiction
- Location: Michigan
- Country: United States
- Inaugurated: 1976
- Most recent: 2016
- Attendance: 600+
- Organizer: ConClave, Incorporated
- Filing status: Not For Profit

ConClave was an annual, weekend-long science fiction convention in southeastern/central Michigan, which drew approximately 600 people. ConClave attendees shared an interest in science, science fiction, fantasy, and related genres. The ConClave convention was held each year from 1976 to 2016, with the exception of 2012. In 2017, the convention was rebranded as the Continuum.

While remaining true to its literary roots, ConClave celebrated fantasy and science fiction in all its myriad forms, including art, music, theatrical performance, and film. Displays included animation, television, fantasy role-play, and renaissance reenactment. Participants included gaming enthusiasts, writers of fiction, pilots of spaceships, Rennies, and Furries. ConClave was an all-ages event.

== Attractions ==
ConClave had several established traditional attractions, most notably a well-supplied Convention Hospitality Suite, a Saturday Night Costume Ball, a merchandise area, several tracks of programming of interest to its membership, and a loyal following of staff and panel participants. Programming tracks include writing/literature, SF/Fantasy, Science/Space, Music, and Gaming.

Recent additions to Conclave retinue have been a video room that screens rare anime and fan-created SF/Fantasy shorts, astronomical observing, and prep workshops for those interested in participating in NaNoWriMo.

== Past conventions ==
ConClave I was held in 1976 in the student union on the campus of Eastern Michigan University in Ypsilanti, Michigan. The convention chair was Tom Barber. The guests of honor were authors Clifford D. Simak and James Gunn. Other notable guests included Lloyd Biggle, T. L. Sherred, Joan Hunter Holly, Stanley Schmidt, and Dean McLaughlin.

ConClave II was held in 1977 in Romulus, Michigan. The convention co-chairs were Tom Barber and Steve Simmons. Thee guest of honor was Ben Bova. The Fan Guests of Honor were Bob and Anne Passovoy. The special guest of honor was Robert A. Heinlein.

ConClave III was held in 1978 in Romulus, Michigan. The convention co-chairs were Steve Simmons and Mary Ann Mueller. The guest of honor was Theodore Sturgeon. The fan guest of honor was Elizabeth Pearse.

ConClave IV was held in 1979 in Romulus, Michigan. The guest of gonor was A. E. van Vogt. The fan guest of honor was Mary Anne Mueller.

ConClave V was held in 1980 in Toledo, Ohio. The convention chair was Dan Story. The guest of honor was Joan D. Vinge. The fan guest of honor was Delphyne Joan Woods.

ConClave VI was held in 1981 in Romulus, Michigan. The guest of honor was John Varley. The fan guests of honor were Jon Stopa and Joni Stopa.

ConClave VII was held in 1982 in Romulus, Michigan. The convention chair was Terry Harris. Guest of Honor was Algis Budrys. The Fan Guest of Honor was Jeff Duntemann.

ConClave VIII was held in 1983 in Ann Arbor, Michigan. The convention co-chairs were Tom Barber and Anna O'Connell. Guest of Honor was Marta Randall. The Fan Guest of Honor was Bill Maraschiello.

ConClave IX was held in 1984 in Plymouth, Michigan. The convention chair was Tara Barber. Guest of Honor was David Brin. The Fan Guests of Honor were Juanita and Buck Coulson.

ConClave X was held in 1985 in Plymouth, Michigan. Guests of Honor were Karen and Poul Anderson. The Fan Guest of Honor was Mark Evans.

ConClave XI was held in 1986 in Plymouth, Michigan. The convention chair was Tara Barber. Guest of Honor was Greg Bear. The Fan Guest of Honor was John and Joanne Hall.

ConClave XII was held in 1987 in Southfield, Michigan. The convention chair was Chris Clayton. Guest of Honor was Gene Wolfe. The Fan Guest of Honor was Joey Shoji.

ConClave XIII was held in 1988 in Southfield, Michigan. The convention chair was Rebecca Price. Guest of Honor was Gordon R. Dickson. The Artist Guest of Honor was Todd Cameron Hamilton. The Fan Guest of Honor was T. J. Burnside.

ConClave XIV was held in 1989 in Plymouth, Michigan. The convention chair was Anna O'Connell. Guest of Honor was Christopher Stasheff. The Music Guest of Honor was Michael Longcor. The Fan Guests of Honor were Chip and Janice Morningstar.

ConClave XV was held in 1990 in Southfield, Michigan. The convention chair was Elizabeth Huffman. Guest of Honor was Stanley Schmidt. The Fan Guests of Honor were Bill Higgins and Barry Gehm. The Special Guests of Honor were Bill and Brenda Sutton.

ConClave XVI was held in 1991 in Southfield, Michigan. The convention chair was David Stein. Guest of Honor was Lawrence Watt-Evans. The Fan Guest of Honor was Professor Edward Stasheff.

ConClave XVII was held in 1992 in Southfield, Michigan. The convention chair was Tara Barber. Guest of Honor was Lois McMaster Bujold. The Fan Guests of Honor were Barry and Sally Childs-Helton.

ConClave XVIII was held in 1993 in Southfield, Michigan. The convention co-chairs were Doug Houseman and Anna O'Connell. Guest of Honor was Roger Zelazny. The Artist Guest of Honor was Frank Kelly Freas. The Fan Guests of Honor were Laura and Dick Spellman.

ConClave XIX was held in 1994 in Southfield, Michigan. The convention co-chairs were Elizabeth Huffman and David Stein. Guests of Honor were Lloyd Biggle, Dean McLaughlin, and Ted Reynolds. The Artist Guests of Honor were Frank Kelly Freas and Laura Brodian Freas. The Fan Guests of Honor were Rene and Carol Gobeyn. The Special Guests of Honor were Todd Johnson and Mary Burke.

ConClave XX was held in 1995 in Lansing, Michigan. The convention chair was Tom Barber. Guest of Honor was Timothy Zahn. The Fan Guests of Honor were David and Marsha Brim. The special guest of honor was Barret Hansen.

ConClave XXI was held in 1996 in Lansing, Michigan. The convention chair was Elizabeth Huffman. Guest of Honor was David Weber. The Fan Guests of Honor were Anne Brett, Lee Carol, and Tom Dow.

ConClave XXII was held in 1997 in Lansing, Michigan. The convention chair was David Roach. Guests of Honor were Karen and Poul Anderson. The Science Guest of Honor was Christian Ready. The Fan Guest of Honor was Sarah Zettel.

ConClave XXIII was held in 1998 in Lansing, Michigan. The convention chair was Elizabeth Huffman. Guest of Honor was Esther Friesner. The Fan Guests of Honor were Garth Barbour and Michele Smith-Moore. The Special Guests of Honor were Juanita and Buck Coulson.

ConClave XXIV was held in 1999 in Lansing, Michigan. The convention chair was Elizabeth Huffman. Guest of Honor was James Hogan. The Artist Guest of Honor was Erin McKee. The Fan Guest of Honor was Marian Skupski.

ConClave XXV was held in 2000 in Lansing, Michigan. The convention chair was Tom Barber. Guest of Honor was David Weber. The Artist Guest of Honor was Todd Cameron Hamilton. The Fan Guests of Honor were Cindy and David Manship. The Music Guest of Honor was Michael Longcor.

ConClave XXVI was held in 2001 in Lansing, Michigan. The convention co-chairs were Shelley Dougan and Elizabeth Huffman. Guest of Honor was L. Warren Douglas. The Fan Guests of Honor were Chip and Janice Morningstar. The Special Guests of Honor were Christian Ready and Jeri Smith-Ready.

ConClave XXVII was held in 2002 in Lansing, Michigan. The convention co-chairs were Joshua Wong and Allen Bernstein. Guest of Honor was Larry Niven. The Artist Guest of Honor was Susan Van Camp. The Fan Guest of Honor was Peg Huffaker.

ConClave XXVIII was held October 17–19, 2003, at the Holiday Inn South – Convention Center in Lansing, Michigan. Literary Guests of Honor were Michael Kube-McDowell and Jody Lynn Nye. Artist Guest of Honor was Michael Arcana. Fan Guests of Honor were Bill and Brenda Sutton.

ConClave XXIX was held October 22–24, 2004, at the Holiday Inn South – Convention Center in Lansing, Michigan. Author Guest of Honor was Tanya Huff. Artist Guest of Honor was Heather Bruton. Fan Guests of Honor were Barry and Sally Childs-Helton. Special Guest of Honor was Marty Fabish.

ConClave XXX was held October 7–9, 2005, at the Holiday Inn South – Convention Center in Lansing, Michigan. Author Guest of Honor was Wen Spencer. Artist Guest of Honor was Butch Honeck. Science Guest of Honor was Steve Collins. Fan Guest of Honor was Uncle Kage. Music Guest of Honor was Tom Smith.

ConClave XXXI was held October 6–8, 2006, at the Crowne Plaza Detroit Metro Airport in Romulus, Michigan. Literary Guest of Honor was Catherine Asaro. Artist Guest of Honor was Voltaire. Fan Guests of Honor were Rene and Carol Gobeyn. Music Guest of Honor was Emerald Rose. Other notable guests included Tom Smith, Samuel Conway, Rochelle Weber, and Kathryn Sullivan. Scheduled guests Nick Pollotta and Timothy Albee were unable to attend.

ConClave XXXII was held October 12–14, 2007, at the Crowne Plaza Detroit Metro Airport in Romulus, Michigan. Literary Guest of Honor was Kim Harrison. Artist Guest of Honor was Don Maitz. Fan Guest of Honor was Richard Tucholka. Other notable guests included Janny Wurts, 2 the Ranting Gryphon, Space Time Theater, Tiffany Aaron, Raven Bower, Michael Andaluz, and the musical stylings of Wild Mercy.

ConClave XXXIII was held October 3–5, 2008, at the Crowne Plaza Detroit Metro Airport in Romulus, Michigan. Literary Guest of Honor was Michelle West. Artist Guest of Honor was Theresa Mather. Fan Guests of Honor were Lee Carroll and Anne Brett.

ConClave XXXIV was held October 9–11, 2009, at the Crowne Plaza Detroit Metro Airport in Romulus, Michigan. Literary Guest of Honor was Travis S. Taylor. Science Guest of Honor was Brother Guy J. Consolmagno, S.J. Fan Guest of Honor was Barry Gehm. Other notable guests included Tom Smith, Bill and Gretchen Roper, Space Time Theater, Samuel Conway, Lee Carroll and Anne Brett, Toyboat, and Erica Neely.

ConClave XXXV was held October 8–10, 2010, at the Crowne Plaza Detroit Metro Airport in Romulus, Michigan. Literary Guest of Honor was S.M. Stirling. Omnibus Guest of Honor was Juanita Coulson. Artist Guest of Honor was Peri Charlifu. Fan Guest of Honor was L. Warren Douglas. Other guests included Bill Higgins, Steve Climer, Tim Curran, Darwin Garrison, Lois Gresh, Daniel J. Hogan, William Jones, M. Keaton, Ferrel "Rick" Moore, Stewart Sternberg, Charles P. Zaglanis, Mark Bernstein, Mike Longcor, Ellen "Blade" McMicking, Tom Smith, Halina Harding, Robert Passovoy, and Bill and Brenda Sutton.

ConClave XXXVI was held October 7–9, 2011 at the Crowne Plaza Detroit Metro Airport in Romulus, Michigan.

ConClave was not held in 2012.

ConClave XXXVII was held October 11–13, 2013, at the Doubletree By Hilton Hotel in Dearborn, Michigan. The Author Guest of Honor was Allen Steele.

ConClave XXXVIII was held October 10–12, 2014, at the Doubletree By Hilton Hotel in Dearborn, Michigan. The Author Guest of Honor was Kelly McCullough.

ConClave 39 was held on October 9–11, 2015, at the Doubletree By Hilton Hotel in Dearborn, Michigan. The literary Guest of Honor was Jody Lynn Nye with Special Guest M. Keaton.

ConClave 40 was held on October 7–9, 2016, at the Holiday Inn Detroit Livonia Conference Center in Livonia, MI. Guests of Honor were Jacqueline Carey and Michael O. Varhola.

== Current status ==
ConClave 40 was the last instance of ConClave. The convention was replaced in the calendar by Continuum. Continuum was all new leadership and their first took place from October 13–15, 2017, and the second from October 5–8, 2018. Continuum was not held in 2019.
