= Gateway (novel) =

1977 novel by Frederik Pohl

- First edition cover
- Author: Frederik Pohl
- Illustrator: Vincent DiFate (serial)
- Cover artist: Boris Vallejo
- Language: English
- Series: Heechee Saga
- Genre: Science fiction
- Publisher: St. Martin's Press
- Publication date: April 1977 (serial from Nov 1976)
- Publication place: United States
- Media type: Print (hardcover)
- Pages: 313 (first ed.)
- Awards: Nebula Award for Best Novel (1977); Hugo Award for Best Novel (1978); John W. Campbell Memorial Award for Best Science Fiction Novel (1978); Locus Award for Best Novel (1978)
- ISBN: 0-312-31780-8
- OCLC: 2862581
- Dewey Decimal: 813/.5/4
- LC Class: PZ4.P748 Gat PS3566.O36
- Followed by: Beyond the Blue Event Horizon

Gateway is a 1977 science-fiction novel by American writer Frederik Pohl. It is the opening novel in the Heechee saga, with four sequels that followed (five books overall). Gateway won the 1978 Hugo Award for Best Novel, the 1978 Locus Award for Best Novel, the 1977 Nebula Award for Best Novel, and the 1978 John W. Campbell Memorial Award for Best Science Fiction Novel. The novel was adapted into a computer game in 1992.

Gateway was serialized in Galaxy prior to its hardcover publication. A short concluding chapter, cut before publication, was later published in the August 1977 issue of Galaxy.

== Plot summary ==
Gateway is an asteroid hollowed out by the Heechee, a long-vanished alien race. Humans have had limited success understanding the left-behind bits of Heechee technology found there and elsewhere. The Gateway Corporation administers the asteroid on behalf of the governments of the United States, the Soviet Union, the New People's Asia, the Venusian Confederation, and the United States of Brazil.

Nearly a thousand small, abandoned starships are located at Gateway. By extremely dangerous trial and error, humans have partially learned how to operate them. The controls for selecting a destination have been identified, but nobody knows where a particular setting will take the ship, how long the trip will last, or even if enough fuel is available to get back. Those who choose to risk their lives cram the limited space with equipment and hopefully enough food for the trip, but sometimes it is not enough, and they have to resort first to cannibalism, and if that is not enough, to suicide. Attempts at reverse engineering to find out how the ships work have ended only in disaster, as has changing the settings in midflight. Most settings lead to useless or lethal places. A few, however, result in the discovery of new Heechee artifacts and habitable planets in other star systems, making the crews extremely wealthy. The vessels were made in three standard sizes, which can hold a maximum of one, three, or five people. Some "threes" and many "fives" are armored. Each ship includes a lander to visit a planet or other object if one is found.

Despite the risks, many people on impoverished, overcrowded Earth dream of going to Gateway. Robinette Stetley Broadhead is a young food shale miner who wins a lottery, giving him enough money to purchase a one-way ticket to Gateway. Once there, he is frightened of the danger and puts off going on a mission as long as he can. In the meantime, he becomes romantically involved with two different women, eventually settling on Gelle-Klara Moynlin, his co-enabler in fearful delaying. Eventually, he starts running out of money, and although still terrified, he goes out on three trips. The first, with Klara and three others, is unsuccessful, and afterwards tension rises between them until he gives her a vicious beating. On the second trip, he goes by himself and inadvertently makes a discovery through unauthorized experimentation when he becomes infuriated after reaching Gateway Two, a smaller version of Gateway with only about 150 ships. He is awarded a sizable bonus because his route saves about 100 days of travel time; the windfall is partially offset by the large penalty for incapacitating his ship. On his third trip, the Gateway Corporation tries something different – sending two armored fives, one slightly behind the other, to the same destination, one rejected by most ships' computers; each crewmember is promised a million-dollar bonus. Bob signs up in desperation, along with Klara, with whom he has reconciled.

When the ships arrive, their crews find to their horror that they are in the gravitational grip of a black hole without enough power to break free. One person devises a desperate escape plan: Move everyone into one ship and thrust the other toward the black hole with an explosion in a lander, thus gaining enough of a boost to escape. They work frantically to transfer unnecessary equipment to make room for everyone in one ship, but Broadhead finds himself alone in the wrong ship when time runs out. He closes the hatch so that the plan can proceed. However, his ship is the one that breaks free.

Broadhead returns to Gateway and is awarded all the mission bonuses. He feels such enormous survivor guilt for dooming his crewmates, especially Klara, that he suppresses his memories of what happened, but he is very disturbed and miserable, though he does not understand why. Back on Earth as a wealthy man, he seeks therapy from an artificial intelligence Freudian therapist program, which he names Sigfrid von Shrink.

The narrative alternates in time between Broadhead's experiences on Gateway and his sessions with Sigfrid, converging on the traumatic events near the black hole and Broadhead finally remembering them so he can begin to heal. Sigfrid helps him realize that due to the gravitational time dilation of the black hole's immense gravity field, time is passing much more slowly for his former crewmates and none of them have actually died yet. Broadhead, however, concludes that this means that they will still be alive when he dies, with Klara still believing that he betrayed them to save himself.

Also embedded in the narrative are various mission reports (usually with fatalities), roster openings, technical bulletins, and other documents Broadhead might have read on Gateway, adding to the verisimilitude. The economic side of living at Gateway is presented in detail, commencing with the contract all explorers must enter into with the Gateway Corporation, and including how some awards are determined.

== Reception ==
C. Ben Ostrander reviewed Gateway in The Space Gamer No. 12. Ostrander commented, "I loved this book. I like books that don't solve big problems, but take care of the characters."

== Reviews ==
- Review by Lester del Rey (1977) in Analog Science Fiction/Science Fact, February 1977
- Review by David Johns (1977) in Galileo, July 1977
- Review by Charles N. Brown (1977) in Isaac Asimov's Science Fiction Magazine, Fall 1977
- Review by David Samuelson (1977) in Locus, #203 August 1977
- Review by Jeff Frane (1978) in Delap's F & SF Review, February 1978
- Review by Algis Budrys (1978) in The Magazine of Fantasy and Science Fiction, March 1978
- Review by Chris Morgan (1978) in Vector 86
- Review by Ed Naha (1978) in Future, April 1978
- Review [French] by Denis Guiot (1978) in Fiction, #291
- Review by Philip Stephensen-Payne (1978) in Paperback Parlour, August 1978
- Review by Andrew Kaveney (1978) in Foundation, #14 September 1978
- Review by Richard Lupoff (1978) in Algol, #33, Winter 1978–1979
- Review by Bruce Gillespie (1980) in SF Commentary, #60/61
- Review [German] by uncredited (1982) in Reclams Science Fiction Führer
- Review [French] by Michel Levert (1983) in Proxima [France], #0
- Review by Gene DeWeese (1985) in Science Fiction Review, Fall 1985
- Review by M. H. Zool (1989) in Bloomsbury Good Reading Guide to Science Fiction and Fantasy
- Review by Stuart Carter (1999) in Vector 207
- Review [Spanish] by José Miguel Pallarés (2001) in Las 100 mejores novelas de ciencia ficción del siglo XX
- Review by Darrell Bain (2005) in My 100 Most Readable (and Re-Readable) Science Fiction Novels
- Review by Graham Sleight (2006) in Locus, #551 December 2006
- Review by Rob Weber (2014) in Big Sky, #3: SF Masterworks 1

== Television adaptation attempts ==
In 2015 Variety announced that a Gateway TV series was going to be written and produced by David Eick and Josh Pate for Syfy, although it failed to enter production. In 2017 Skybound Entertainment made an agreement with the Pohl estate for another attempt at making a TV series but it failed to begin production as well.
