= Poltergeist (website) =

Polish speculative fiction web portal

- logo of the website
- Website type: Web portal
- Available in: Polish
- Country of origin: Poland
- Website: www.polter.pl

Poltergeist (also Polter.pl, formerly rpg.net.pl) is the largest of the Polish web portals dedicated to speculative fiction. It has sub-editions about literature, cinema, comics, RPG games, boardgames, wargames, card games, video games and conventions. Polter.pl is also a blogging platform, and contains a large web forum.

The owner and publisher of Polter.pl is InteliMedia.

== History ==
Polter.pl was founded as a print magazine in 2000. After the first issue, it was transformed into an online portal. Major changes to the website's appearance were made in 2001, 2006, 2009, and 2013.

== Recognition ==
Polter.pl got a few awards and mentions during its existence:

- In December 2003 the magazine Wprost named Polter its webpage of a week.
- In April 2005 Polter.pl was distinguished by the Polish editors of Playboy.
- In 2003 the International Association of Webmasters and Designers has granted to Polter.pl 2 Golden Web Awards (for the project of the gallery and the main site of the portal).

== Contents ==
Initially, the portal focused on role-playing games, but soon content related to other types of fantasy appeared. The portal features articles and reviews of various media, some written by members of the editorial team, many by community members, who are rewarded for constructive activity with the portal's internal currency (szton tokens).

== Editors ==
Jan Popieluch is currently the website's seventh editor-in-chief. On July 1, 2010, Maciej Reputakowski became the website's sixth editor-in-chief, replacing Piotr Brewczyński, who was fifth. Before them, the position was held by Tomasz Dzierżek (first), Maciej Dzierżek (second), Rafał Błaszczak (third), and Przemysław Prekurat (fourth).

== Patronages ==
Poltergeist patrons many publications of the Polish market - of books, comics and games. It also supports many conventions in Poland.

== Forum ==
An integral part of the portal is a discussion forum. Poltergeist possesses one of the largest speculative fiction forums in Poland, with over 49000 registered users and almost 1 million posts.

== Blogs ==
The site also serves as a blogging platform. Every registered user of Polter.pl can easily have their own personal blog integrated with the portal. As its peak, there were around 200 blog posts in a month.

== Rallies ==
From 2007 to 2014 Poltergeist organized Poltergeist Rallies - week-long summer meetings during which people could meet with the editors and others fans of the portal. The Rally participance was free and open to everyone.
