= Ray Gun Revival =

Canadian science fiction webzine (2006–2012)

- Overlord: Johne Cook, L. S. King, Paul Christian Glenn
- Categories: Fiction, Flash fiction
- Frequency: Weekly
- Publisher: Every Day Publishing Ltd.
- Unpaid circulation: approx. 2,000 RSS/Email Subscribers/month (as of Sept, 2011)
- First issue: September 1, 2006; 19 years ago
- Final issue: 2012
- Country: Canada
- Language: American English
- Website: raygunrevival.com
- ISSN: 1918-1000

Ray Gun Revival (RGR) was a webzine of space opera and golden age science fiction. The first issue was published in July 2006. Founded by Johne Cook, L. S. King, and Paul Christian Glenn, who call themselves "Overlords", RGR was inspired in part by the (now defunct) Deep Magic PDF e-zine. Some of the same contributors who worked with Deep Magic now work with RGR. It features short stories and serials, and is known for its lavish, science-fiction-themed cover art.

In 2009, Bill Snodgrass of Double Edged Publishing decided to take a step back from publishing fiction and the Overlords announced that the magazine's future was uncertain. This announcement was seen by Jordan Ellinger, RGR contributing author and managing editor of Every Day Fiction. Long a fan of the magazine, Ellinger volunteered to take over publication in a new format under the Every Day Publishing label, subject to the condition that the magazine not publish any work by any member of its staff. He envisioned a new semi-pro magazine that would publish in a weekly format, anchored by at least one pro-author per month.

Early in the magazine's new format, RGR was approached by Mike Resnick as a potential home for his Catastrophe Baker series. To-date, the magazine has published eight Catastrophe Baker stories

RayGunRevival.com was featured on SciFi.com as "Site of the Week" on June 13, 2007.

== Controversy ==
In August 2007, the magazine found itself caught up in the controversy surrounding SFWA's issuance of overly broad DMCA takedown notices. It had been a policy of Overlord Johne Cook to upload back issues of the magazine to Scribd, an online repository for the exchange of documents, as a way of attracting traffic to the site, and SFWA ordered these issues removed against his wishes. Cook contacted Cory Doctorow, John Scalzi, and Jason Bentley about the notices, and Doctorow quickly published an article on the notices in his webzine Boing Boing. News quickly spread from there.

This incident was one of the issues that caused the future President of SFWA, John Scalzi, to endorse winning candidate Russell Davis over Andrew Burt, head of the ePiracy committee at that time, for President of the organization.

== Closure ==
On 7 October 2012 the magazine announced it was closing, with a headline "Overlords’ Lair: One Last Story".

== Editors ==
- Johne Cook, Overlord 2006–2012
- L.S.King, Overlord 2006–2012
- Paul Christian Glenn, Overlord 2006–2012

== Authors published in EDF ==
- Mike Resnick
- Larry Hodges
- Steve Stanton
- Michael Ehart
- Adam Colston

== See also ==
- List of literary magazines
- List of Canadian magazines
