= Frederik Pohl bibliography =

This is an incomplete list of works by American space opera and science fiction author Frederik Pohl, including co-authored works.

== Works ==
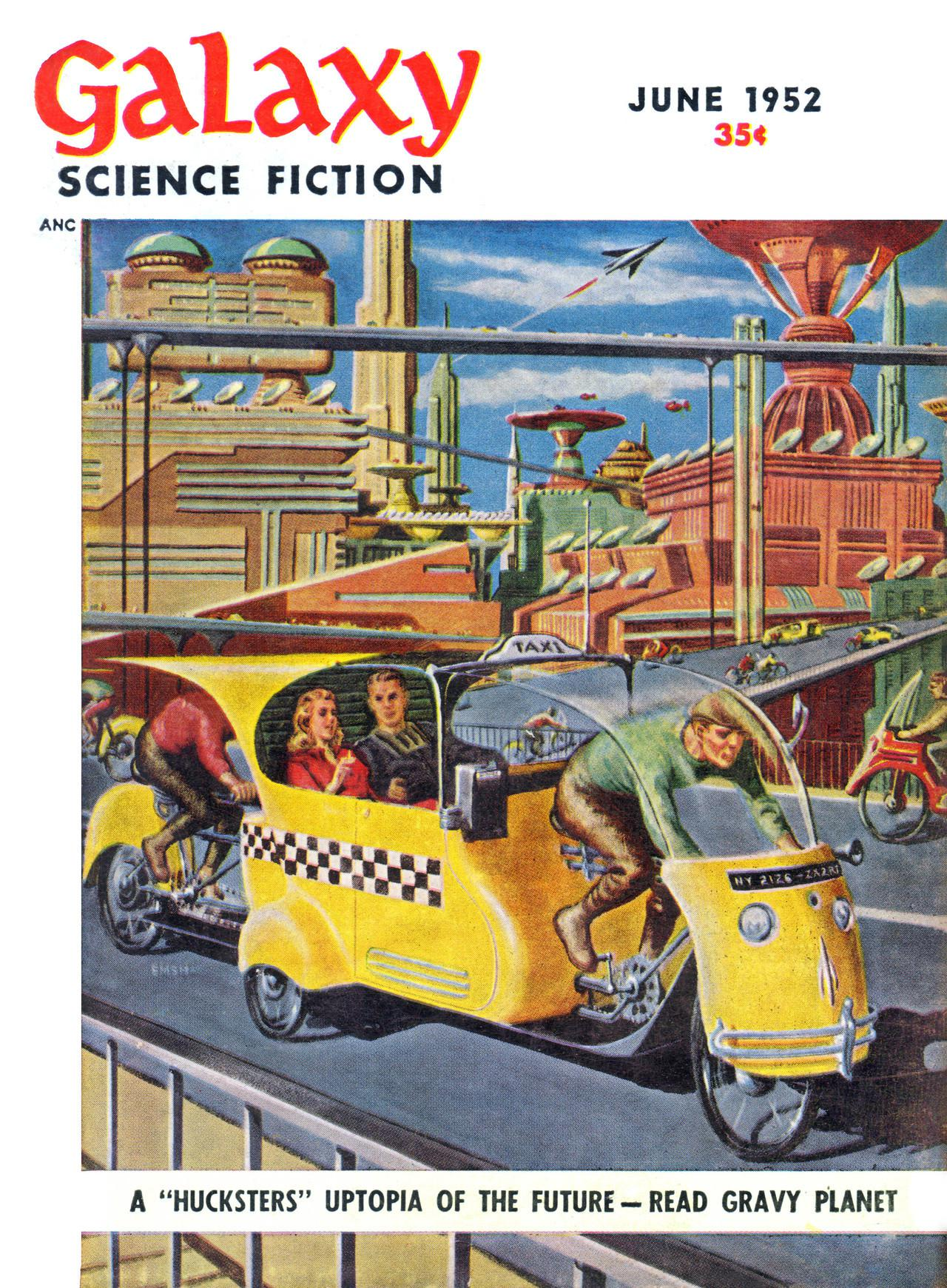
The first installment of Gravy Planet (The Space Merchants), by Pohl and Cyril M. Kornbluth, was cover-featured on the June 1952 issue of Galaxy Science Fiction.

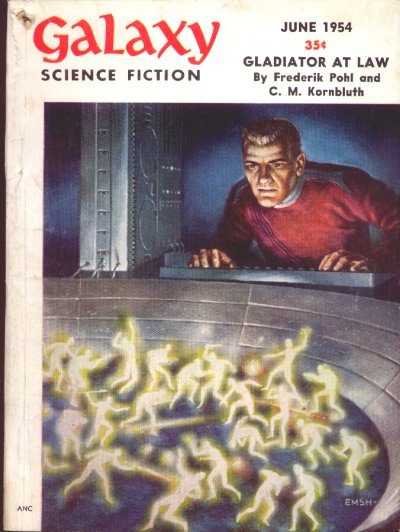
Another Pohl-Kornbluth collaboration, Gladiator-at-Law, took the cover of the June 1954 Galaxy Science Fiction in 1954, illustrated by Ed Emshwiller.

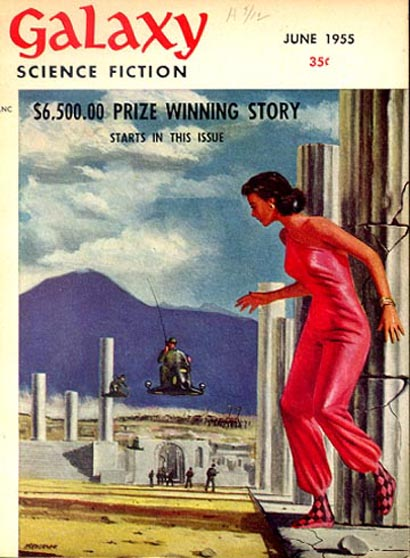
Pohl and Lester del Rey collaborated to write Preferred Risk on short notice when no suitable winner was submitted to a novel-writing contest for Galaxy in 1955.

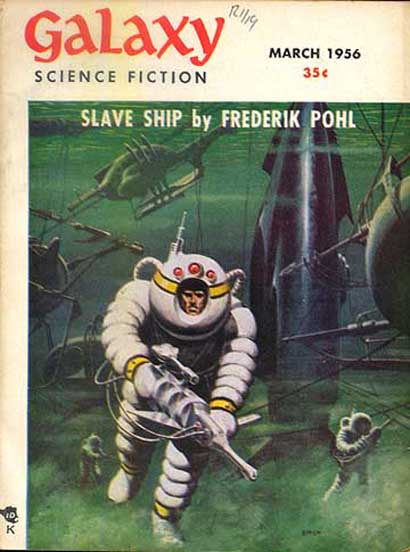
Pohl's first solo novel, Slave Ship, was serialized in Galaxy in 1956.

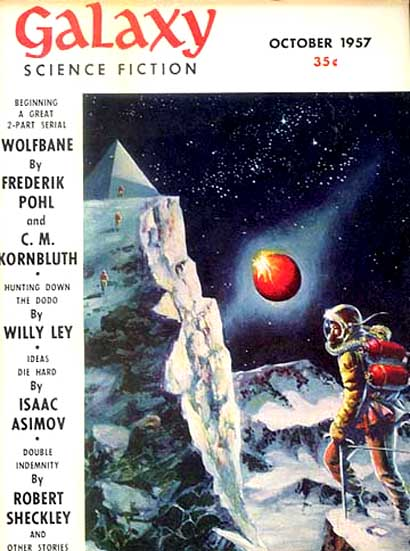
The last Pohl-Kornbluth sf novel, Wolfbane, was serialized in Galaxy Science Fiction in 1957, with a cover illustration by Wally Wood.

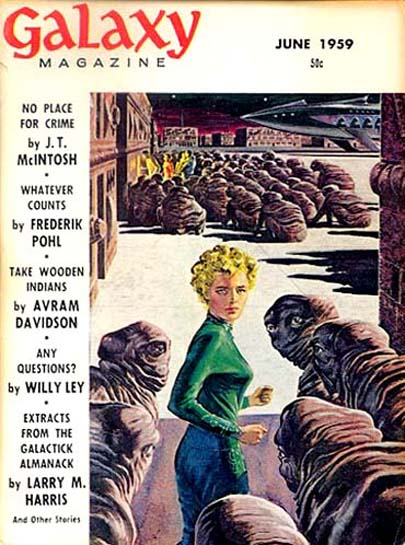
Pohl's novella Whatever Counts was the cover story on the June 1959 Galaxy Science Fiction.

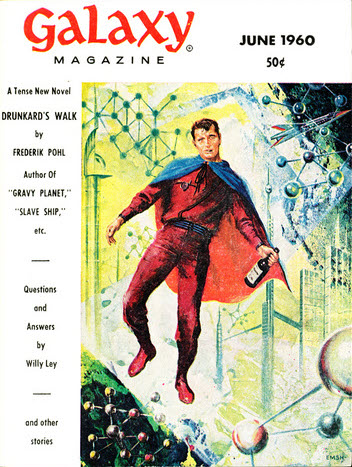
Pohl's second solo novel, Drunkard's Walk, was serialized in Galaxy in 1960.

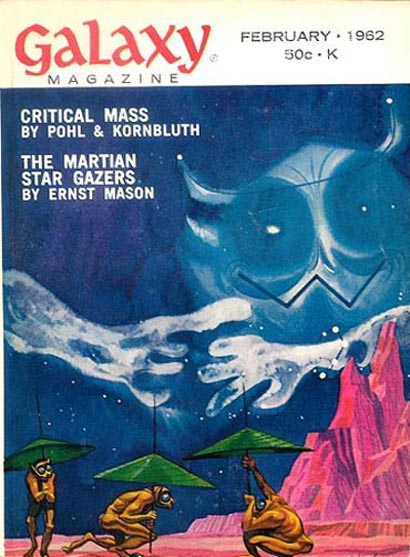
Pohl's "The Martian Star-Gazers" (under his "Ernest Mason" pseudonym) was the cover story on the February 1962 Galaxy Science Fiction, while the Pohl-Kornbluth story "Critical Mass" was also cover-featured.

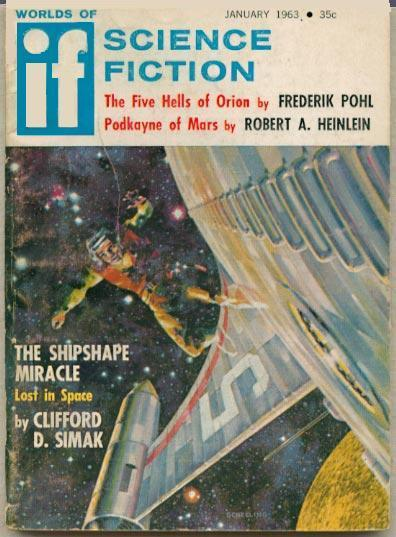
Pohl's novelette "The Five Hells of Orion" was the cover story on the January 1963 issue of If.

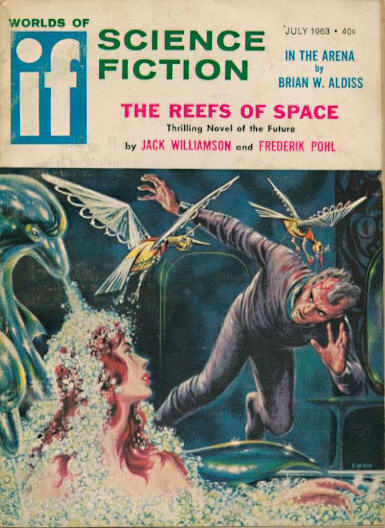
The Reefs of Space, which Pohl cowrote with Jack Williamson, was serialized in If in 1963.

=== Series ===
==== Heechee ====
1. Gateway (1977)—winner of the Campbell Memorial, Hugo, Locus SF, and Nebula Awards as the year's Best Novel
2. Beyond the Blue Event Horizon (1980)—second place, Locus SF Award, and finalist for the British SF, Hugo, and Nebula Awards
3. Heechee Rendezvous (1984)—third place, Locus SF Award
4. The Annals of the Heechee (1987)
5. The Gateway Trip: Tales and Vignettes of the Heechee, (1990) (collection of short stories involving the Heechee, including the 1972 story "The Merchants of Venus", the first mention of the Heechee)
6. The Boy Who Would Live Forever: A Novel of Gateway (2004), nominated for the Campbell Memorial Award

==== Eschaton trilogy ====
1. The Other End of Time (1996)
2. The Siege of Eternity (1997)
3. The Far Shore of Time (1999)

==== Mars ====
1. Man Plus (1976)—winner of the Nebula Award; Campbell Memorial runner up, Locus SF third place, and Hugo finalist
2. Mars Plus (1994) also listed under collaborations

==== Space Merchants ====
1. The Space Merchants (1953) also listed under collaborations
2. The Merchants' War (1984)
3. The two novels were published together as: Venus, Inc. (1985) (SFBC omnibus)

=== Other novels (not parts of series) ===
- Slave Ship (1956) (Galaxy Magazine 1956, Ballantine 1956)
- Edge of the City (1957), novelization of the screenplay by Robert Alan Aurthur, Ballantine paperback
- Drunkard's Walk (1960) (Galaxy Magazine June-Aug 1960, Ballantine paperback 1960)
- A Plague of Pythons (1962) (Galaxy Magazine Oct-Dec 1962, Ballantine paperback 1965; updated version published in 1984 as Demon in the Skull)
- The Age of the Pussyfoot (1965) (Galaxy Magazine Oct. 1965-Feb. 1966, Trident hardcover 1969)
- Jem (1979) winner of the National Book Award; (With essay by Ron Hogan from the Awards 60-year anniversary blog) finalist for the Hugo and Nebula Awards, sixth place for the Locus Award
- The Cool War (1981)
- Syzygy (1981)
- Starburst (1982)
- The Years of the City (1984)—winner of the Campbell Memorial Award, sixth place Locus Collection. The Years of the City is a collection of five linked novellas, two previously published.
  - "Introduction"
  - "When New York Hit the Fan" 1984 (original here)
  - "The Greening of Bed-Stuy" 1984
  - "The Blister" 1984
  - "Second-Hand Sky" 1984 (original here)
  - "Gwenanda and the Supremes" 1984 (original here)
- Black Star Rising (1985)
- The Coming of the Quantum Cats (1986)
- Terror (1986)
- Chernobyl (1987)
- The Day the Martians Came (1988) (actually 7 previously published stories plus 3 new, plus connecting material)
- Narabedla Ltd. (1988)
- Homegoing (1989)
- The World at the End of Time (1990)
- Outnumbering the Dead (1990)
- Stopping at Slowyear (1991)
- Mining the Oort (1992)
- The Voices of Heaven (1994)
- O Pioneer! (1998)
- All the Lives He Led (2011)

=== Collaborations ===
==== with Isaac Asimov ====
- "The Little Man on the Subway" (1950) (under the pseudonym James MacCreigh)
- "Legal Rites" (1950) (as James MacCreigh)

==== with Cyril M. Kornbluth ====
- The Space Merchants (1953) (a sole-author sequel, The Merchant's War, appeared in 1984)
- Search the Sky (1954) (heavily revised 1985)
- Gladiator-At-Law (1955) (revised 1986)
- Presidential Year (1956)
- A Town Is Drowning (1955)
- Sorority House (1956) as by 'Jordan Park', a lesbian pulp novel
- Wolfbane (1959)

-see also the short-story collections The Wonder Effect, Critical Mass, Before the Universe, and the selected stories Our Best: The Best of Frederik Pohl and C.M. Kornbluth (listed under collections)

==== with Jack Williamson ====
- Undersea Trilogy
1. Undersea Quest (1954)
2. Undersea Fleet (1956)
3. Undersea City (1958)
- Starchild Trilogy
1. The Reefs of Space (1964)
2. Starchild (1965)
3. Rogue Star (1969)
- Saga of Cuckoo
1. Farthest Star (1975)
2. Wall Around a Star (1983)
- Land's End (1988)
- The Singers of Time (1991)

==== with Lester Del Rey ====
- Preferred Risk (1955) under the joint pseudonym Edson McCann

==== with Thomas T. Thomas ====
- Mars Plus (1994) sequel to Man Plus

==== with Arthur C. Clarke ====
- The Last Theorem (2008)

=== Collections ===
- Alternating Currents (1956)
  - "Happy Birthday, Dear Jesus" (original here)
  - "The Ghost Maker", 1954
  - "Let the Ants Try", 1949
  - "Pythias", 1955
  - "The Mapmakers", 1955
  - "Rafferty's Reasons", 1955
  - "Target One", 1955
  - "Grandy Devil", 1955
  - "The Tunnel under the World", 1955
  - "What to Do Until the Analyst Comes ["Everybody's Happy But Me!"]", 1956
- The Case Against Tomorrow (1957)
  - "The Midas Plague", 1954
  - "The Census Takers", 1956
  - "The Candle Lighter", 1955
  - "The Celebrated No-Hit Inning", 1956
  - "Wapshot's Demon", 1956
  - "My Lady Green Sleeves" 1957
- Tomorrow Times Seven (1959)
  - "The Haunted Corpse", 1957
  - "The Middle of Nowhere", 1955
  - "The Gentle Venusian ["The Gentlest Unpeople"]", 1958
  - "The Day of the Boomer Dukes", 1956
  - "Survival Kit", 1957
  - "The Knights of Arthur", 1958
  - "To See Another Mountain", 1959
- The Man Who Ate the World (1960)
  - "The Man Who Ate the World", 1956
  - "The Wizards of Pung's Corners", 1959
  - "The Waging of the Peace", 1959
  - "The Snowmen", 1959
  - "The Day the Icicle Works Closed", 1959
- Turn Left at Thursday (1961)
  - "Mars by Moonlight", 1958
  - "The Richest Man in Levittown"
  - "The Bitterest Pill", 1959
  - "The Seven Deadly Virtues", 1958
  - "The Martian in the Attic", 1960
  - "Third Offense", 1958 [orig as by Charles Satterfield]
  - "The Hated", 1958
  - "I Plinglot, Who You?", 1959
- The Wonder Effect (1962) (with Cyril M. Kornbluth)
  - "Introduction"
  - "Critical Mass", 1962
  - "A Gentle Dying", 1961
  - "Nightmare with Zeppelins", 1958
  - "Best Friend [as by S. D. Gottesman]", 1941
  - "The World of Myrion Flowers", 1961
  - "Trouble in Time [as by S. D. Gottesman]", 1940
  - "The Engineer", 1956
  - "Mars-Tube [as by S. D. Gottesman]", 1941
  - "The Quaker Cannon", 1961
- The Abominable Earthman, (1963)
  - "The Abominable Earthman", 1961
  - "We Never Mention Aunt Nora" [as by Paul Flehr], 1958
  - "A Life and a Half", 1959
  - "Punch", 1961
  - "The Martian Star-Gazers", 1962
  - "Whatever Counts", 1959
  - "Three Portraits and a Prayer", 1962
- Digits and Dastards (1966)
  - "The Children of Night", 1964
  - "The Fiend", 1964
  - "Earth Eighteen" (as Ernst Mason), 1964
  - "Father of the Stars", 1964
  - "The Five Hells of Orion", 1962
  - "With Redfern on Capella XII", 1965 (writing as Charles Satterfield)
  - "How to Count on Your Fingers", 1956
  - "On Binary Digits and Human Habits", 1962
- The Frederik Pohl Omnibus (1966) [abridged as Survival Kit 1979]
  - "The Man Who Ate the World", (not in Survival Kit)
  - "The Seven Deadly Virtues", 1958
  - "The Day the Icicle Works Closed", 1960 (not in Survival Kit)
  - "The Knights of Arthur", 1958
  - "Mars by Moonlight", 1958
  - " The Haunted Corpse", 1957
  - "The Middle of Nowhere", 1955
  - "The Day of the Boomer Dukes", 1956
  - "The Snowmen", 1959 (not in Survival Kit)
  - "The Wizards of Pung's Corners [Jack Tighe series]", 1958 (not in Survival Kit)
  - "The Waging of the Peace [Jack Tighe series]", 1959 (not in Survival Kit)
  - "Survival Kit", 1957
  - "I Plinglot, Who You?", 1959
- Day Million (1970)
  - "Day Million", 1966
  - "The Deadly Mission of Phineas Snodgrass", 1962
  - "The Day the Martians Came" ["The Day After the Day the Martians Came"], 1967
  - "The Schematic Man", 1969
  - "Small Lords", 1957
  - "Making Love" ["Lovemaking"], 1966
  - "Way Up Yonder", [orig as by Charles Satterfield] 1959
  - "Speed Trap", 1967
  - "It's a Young World", 1941
  - "Under Two Moons", 1965
- The Gold at the Starbow's End (1972)
  - "The Gold at the Starbow's End", 1972
  - "Sad Solarian Screenwriter Sam", 1972
  - "Call Me Million", 1970
  - "Shaffery among the Immortals", 1972
  - "The Merchants of Venus", 1972 (in "Heechee" series)
- The Best of Frederik Pohl (1975)
  - Introduction: "A Variety of Excellence", by Lester del Rey
  - "The Tunnel Under the World", 1954
  - "Punch", 1961
  - "Three Portraits and a Prayer", 1962
  - "Day Million", 1966
  - "Happy Birthday, Dear Jesus", 1956
  - "We Never Mention Aunt Nora", 1958
  - "Father of the Stars", 1964
  - "The Day the Martians Came", 1967
  - "The Midas Plague", 1954
  - "The Snowmen", 1959
  - "How to Count on Your Fingers", 1956
  - "Grandy Devil", 1955
  - "Speed Trap", 1967
  - "The Richest Man in Levittown", 1959 (orig. pub. as "The Bitterest Pill")
  - "The Day the Icicle Works Closed", 1960
  - "The Hated", 1958
  - "The Martian in the Attic", 1960
  - "The Census Takers", 1955
  - "The Children of Night", 1964
  - Afterword: "What the Author Has to Say About All This"
- In The Problem Pit (1976)
  - "Introduction: Science-Fiction Games", 1974
  - "In the Problem Pit", 1973
  - "Let the Ants Try", 1949
  - "To See Another Mountain", 1959
  - "The Deadly Mission of Phineas Snodgrass", 1962 (a.k.a. The Time Machine of Phineas Snodgrass)
  - "Golden Ages Gone Away", 1972
  - "Rafferty's Reasons", 1955
  - "I Remember a Winter", 1972
  - "The Schematic Man", 1968
  - "What to Do Until the Analyst Comes", 1955 (a.k.a. Everybody's Happy But Me!)
  - "Some Joys Under the Star", 1973
  - "The Man Who Ate the World", 1956
  - "SF: The Game-Playing Literature", 1971 (a.k.a. The Game-Playing Literature)
- The Early Pohl (1976):
  - "Elegy for a Dead Planet: Luna", 1937, (writing as Elton Andrews) [a poem, his first published piece]
  - "The Dweller in the Ice", 1940, (writing as James MacCreigh)
  - "The King's Eye", 1940, (writing as James MacCreigh)
  - "It's a Young World", 1940, (writing as James MacCreigh)
  - "Daughters of Eternity", 1940, (writing as James MacCreigh)
  - "Earth, Farewell!" 1940, (writing as James MacCreigh)
  - "Conspiracy on Callisto", 1943, (writing as James MacCreigh)
  - "Highwayman of the Void", 1943, (writing under Dirk Wylie's name)
  - "Double-Cross", 1943, (writing as James MacCreigh)
- Critical Mass (1977) (with Cyril M. Kornbluth)
  - "Introduction", (Pohl)
  - "The Quaker Cannon", 1961
  - "Mute Inglorious Tam", 1974
  - "The World of Myrion Flowers", 1961
  - "The Gift of Garigolli", 1974
  - "A Gentle Dying", 1961
  - "A Hint of Henbane", 1961
  - "The Meeting", 1972
  - "The Engineer", 1956
  - "Nightmare with Zeppelins", 1958
  - "Critical Mass", 1962
  - "Afterword", (Pohl)
- Survival Kit (1979) (abridged from The Frederik Pohl Omnibus 1966, see)
  - "The Seven Deadly Virtues", 1958
  - "The Knights of Arthur", 1958
  - "Mars by Moonlight", 1958
  - "The Haunted Corpse", 1957
  - "The Middle of Nowhere", 1955
  - "The Day of the Boomer Dukes", 1956
  - "Survival Kit", 1957
  - "I Plinglot, Who You?", 1959
- Before the Universe (1980) (with Cyril M. Kornbluth)
  - "Mars-Tube", 1941
  - "Trouble in Time", 1940
  - "Vacant World", 1940
  - "Best Friend", 1941
  - "Nova Midplane", 1940
  - "The Extrapolated Dimwit", 1942
- Planets Three, 1982 (a collection of 3 novellas written as James MacCreigh):
  - "Figurehead, " 1951 (orig as "The Genius Beasts" by MacCreigh)
  - "Red Moon of Danger", 1951 (orig as "Danger Moon" by MacCreigh)
  - "Donovan Had a Dream", 1947
- Midas World (1983)
  - "The Fire-Bringer", (original here)
  - "The Midas Plague", 1954
  - "Servant of the People", 1983
  - "The Man Who Ate the World", 1956
  - "Farmer on the Dole", 1982
  - "The Lord of the Skies", 1983
  - "The New Neighbors", 1983
- Pohlstars (1984) [later Gollancz edition omits the last story]
  - "The Sweet, Sad Queen of the Grazing Isles", [original here]
  - "The High Test", 1983
  - "Spending a Day at the Lottery Fair", 1983
  - "Second Coming", 1983
  - "Enjoy, Enjoy", 1974
  - "Growing Up in Edge City", 1975
  - "We Purchased People", 1974
  - "Rem the Rememberer", 1974
  - "The Mother Trip", 1975
  - "A Day in the Life of Able Charlie", 1976
  - "The Way It Was", 1977
  - "The Wizard-Masters of Peng-Shi Angle (né The Wizards of Pung's Corners)", original story 1958, retranslation 1984.
- Tales from the Planet Earth (1986), created with Elizabeth Anne Hull, a novel with nineteen authors
  - "Sitting Around the Pool, Soaking Up the Rays" 1984
  - "We Servants of the Stars" 1986
- BiPohl (1987), two novels in one volume:
  - Drunkard's Walk
  - The Age of the Pussyfoot
- Our Best: The Best of Frederik Pohl and C.M. Kornbluth (1987) (with Cyril M. Kornbluth)
  - "Introduction", (Pohl)
  - "The Stories of the Sixties", (Pohl, section introduction)
  - "Critical Mass", 1962
  - "The World of Myrion Flowers", 1961
  - "The Engineer", 1956
  - "A Gentle Dying", 1961
  - "Nightmare with Zeppelins", 1958
  - "The Quaker Cannon", 1961
  - "The 60/40 Stories", (Pohl, section introduction)
  - "Trouble in Time [as by S. D. Gottesman]", 1940
  - "Mars-Tube [as by S. D. Gottesman]", ss Astonishing Stories September '41
  - "Epilogue to The Space Merchants", (Pohl, section introduction)
  - "Gravy Planet", (extract from the magazine serial, not used in the book)
  - "The Final Stories", (Pohl, section introduction)
  - "Mute Inglorious Tam", 1974
  - "The Gift of Garigolli", 1974
  - "The Meeting", 1972
  - "Afterword", (Pohl)
- Platinum Pohl (2005)
  - "Introduction", (by James Frenkel)
  - "The Merchants of Venus", 1972 (in the "Heechee" series)
  - "The Things That Happen", 1985
  - "The High Test", 1983
  - "My Lady Green Sleeves", 1957
  - "The Kindly Isle", 1984
  - "The Middle of Nowhere", 1955
  - "I Remember a Winter", 1972
  - "The Greening of Bed-Stuy", 1984
  - "To See Another Mountain", 1959
  - "The Mapmakers", 1955
  - "Spending a Day at the Lottery Fair", 1983
  - "The Celebrated No-Hit Inning", 1956
  - "Some Joys Under the Star", 1973
  - "Servant of the People", 1983
  - "Waiting for the Olympians", 1988
  - "Criticality", 1984
  - "Shaffery Among the Immortals", 1972
  - "The Day the Icicle Works Closed", 1960
  - "Saucery", 1986
  - "The Gold at the Starbow's End", 1972
  - "Growing Up in Edge City", 1975
  - "The Knights of Arthur", 1958
  - "Creation Myths of the Recently Extinct", 1994
  - "The Meeting", 1972 (with C. M. Kornbluth)
  - "Let the Ants Try", 1949
  - "Speed Trap", 1967
  - "The Day the Martians Came" ("The Day After the Day the Martians Came"), 1967
  - "Day Million", 1966
  - "The Mayor of Mare Tranq", 1996
  - "Fermi and Frost", 1985
  - "Afterword: Fifty Years and Counting"

=== Nonfiction ===
- Tiberius (1960) (writing as Ernst Mason)
- Practical Politics 1972 (1971)
- Nebula Winners Fourteen (editor) (1980)
- Science Fiction Studies in Film (1980) (with Frederik Pohl IV)
- Our Angry Earth (1991) (with Isaac Asimov)
- Chasing Science: Science as Spectator Sport (2000)

==== As editor of a compilation of SF short stories ====
- The Expert Dreamers (1962) (Introduction by Pohl; short stories by Morrison, Frisch, Gamow, Asimov, Walter, Willey, Latham, Davis, Hoyle, Ellanby, Norbert, Gregor, Correy, Smith, Szilard)

==== Autobiography ====
- The Way the Future Was (1978)
