= Starburst =

Starburst most often refers to:

- Starburst region, a generic term to describe a region of space with a much higher than normal star formation
- Starburst galaxy, a galaxy with an exceptionally high rate of star formation
- Starburst (candy), a brand of fruit-flavored candy

Starburst may also refer to:

== Culture ==
- Starburst (Farscape), a means of faster-than-light propulsion in the television series Farscape
- Kolvoord Starburst, a maneuver from the Star Trek episode The First Duty.

=== Publications ===
- Starburst (magazine), a British science fiction-related magazine, first published in 1977
- Starburst (Alfred Bester), a collection of short stories by science-fiction author Alfred Bester, 1958
- Starburst (Frederik Pohl), a science-fiction novel by Frederik Pohl, written as an expansion of his novella The Gold at the Starbow's End

=== Music ===
- "Starburst", a song by Danny Brown from Stardust, 2025

== Other uses ==
- Starburst (business), or corporate spin-off, the breaking up of a large company
- Starburst (symbol), a symbol consisting of a star surrounded by rays emanating from it
- Starburst (missile), a British man-portable surface-to-air missile (MANPADS)
- Fourteen-segment display or Starburst display, an alphanumeric display configuration
- StarBurst, an office suite of the early 1980s
- Clerodendrum quadriloculare, a tropical flowering plant that is also called a starburst
- Cross screen filter or Starburst filter, a type of lens filter that creates patterns of lines to radiate from bright points
- Diffraction spike, or a line radiating from a bright light source that can occur in a photograph or vision.
- Starburst amacrine cell
- Starburst anemone
- Starburst effect
- Galaxea, or starburst, a type of coral.
- Imshaugia, or starbust lichens.
  - Imshaugia placorodia, or the American starbust lichen.

== See also ==
- Starburster, a song by Irish rock band Fontaines D.C.
