= The Waging of the Peace =

Satirical science fiction short story by Frederik Pohl

The Waging of the Peace is a satirical science fiction short story by Frederik Pohl, forming a sequel to The Wizards of Pung's Corners. The two stories feature the character Jack Tighe, as the mayor of the small town of Pung's Corners who takes over the United States after a nuclear war. American society has become overrun by consumerism and advertising, but Pung's Corners has refused to allow advertising agencies to work there, causing an attack by the US Army. However, the Army is burdened by over-complicated, unusable weapons and too many non-combat roles, so Tighe's band of rag-tag defenders defeat it and install Tighe as President. In the second story, Tighe and his subordinates have to deal with automated factories, buried underground and virtually invulnerable, which keep turning out consumer products.

== Plot ==
Bill Cossett, who owns an automobile dealership, has a problem. Tighe has forbidden all advertising and all sales techniques. Cossett petitions Tighe to loosen the restrictions, but instead is conscripted into the forces besieging the automated factory, where he witnesses the scope of the problem. The factories cannot be destroyed, and the automated trucks of products that emerge from them are heavily defended and have to be destroyed with massive amounts of scarce ordinance. The factory systems can adapt to attacks and are becoming more and more difficult to overcome.

Tighe's secretary suggests getting into the factory disguised, "like Sherlock Holmes", but as raw materials. This idea seems fantastic at first, but eventually Cossett and his colleagues succeed in reaching the factory and cutting off the supply of material.

However, at a celebratory picnic near the factory exit, another truck emerges. It is destroyed, but the crates it contains start leaking shiny, floating objects. The factory has found a way to make products out of pure force fields, without materials at all. Even worse, there will be no way of getting rid of the old models.

== Related works ==
Pohl wrote about societies suffering from over-abundance due to automation in other stories, notably The Midas Plague, and The Man Who Ate the World. Other stories, such as The Space Merchants, The Merchants' War, and The Tunnel under the World feature malicious advertising agencies.
