= The Merchants' War =

The Merchants' War may refer to:

- The Merchants' War (Pohl novel), by Frederik Pohl
- The Merchants' War (Stross novel), by Charles Stross
