= Alternating Currents =

Alternating Currents may refer to:

- Alternating Currents (collection), a collection of science fiction stories by Frederik Pohl
- Alternating Currents (album), an album by Spyro Gyra
- Alternating current
