= Eschaton (disambiguation) =

The eschaton is a time period described in eschatological writings and doomsday scenarios.

Eschaton may also refer to:

- Eschaton (album), a 2006 album by Anaal Nathrakh
- Ezkaton, a 2008 EP by the band Behemoth
- Eschaton, a single released in 2017 by the indie folk band Darlingside
- Eschaton, a fictional artificial intelligence entity in the Charles Stross novels Singularity Sky and Iron Sunrise
- Eschaton, a liberal weblog written by Duncan B. Black under the pseudonym of Atrios
- Eschaton trilogy, a trilogy of science fiction novels by Frederik Pohl
- Eschaton, a fictional geopolitical game played on four contiguous tennis courts, from the David Foster Wallace novel Infinite Jest
- Eschaton, the primary antagonist in the videogame Might and Magic VIII: Day of the Destroyer
- Eschaton, the fictional historical impact event in the post-apocalypse tabletop-RPG Degenesis

== See also ==
- End time (disambiguation)
- Immanentize the eschaton
