= Imshaugia pyxiniformis =

Scientific classification
- Kingdom: Fungi
- Division: Ascomycota
- Class: Lecanoromycetes
- Order: Lecanorales
- Family: Parmeliaceae
- Genus: Imshaugia
- Species: I. pyxiniformis

Binomial name
- Imshaugia pyxiniformis Elix (2004)

Species of lichen

Imshaugia pyxiniformis is a rare species of corticolous (bark-dwelling), foliose lichen in the family Parmeliaceae. It is only known to occur at its type locality in the North Region of Brazil. Characteristics of the lichen include its narrow, incised lobes, lack of vegetative propagules, its pale lower cortex, and presence of the substance lichexanthone.

== Taxonomy ==
The lichen was formally described as a new species in 2004 by Australian lichenologist Jack Elix. The type specimen was collected from the Serra do Cachimbo mountain range in Pará, at an altitude between 350 and 500 m (1,150 and 1,640 ft); there, in a tall canopy forest, it was found growing on bark in dry vegetation. The species epithet alludes to its superficial resemblance to some Pyxine species. At the time of its publication, the lichen was known to occur only at its type locality.

== Description ==
The thallus of Imshaugia pyxiniformis, tightly attached to the bark substrate and yellow-gray in colour, reaches 3–4 cm (1.2–1.6 in) in diameter. The individual lobes making up the thallus are 0.8–1.5 mm wide, with incised tips. The underside of the thallus is ivory to pale brown, with many simple brown rhizines (up to 1 mm long) serving as holdfasts. Isidia and soredia are absent in this species. Apothecia are present; they are sessile, measuring 0.5–1.2 mm wide with a flat or somewhat concave, dark brown disc. The ascospores, which number eight per ascus, are colourless, somewhat spherical to more or less ellipsoidal, and measure 7–8 by 5–7 μm.

The expected results of standard chemical spot tests are cortex: K−, UV+ (intense yellow); and medulla: K+ (pale yellow-brown), C+ (red), KC+ (red), P+ (orange-red). The positive UV test is caused by lichexanthone, which is present as a minor substance. Other lichen products found in Imshaugia pyxiniformis are protocetraric acid (minor), and 4-O-demethylmicrophyllinic acid as a major substance.
