= Imshaugia sipmanii =

Scientific classification
- Domain: Eukaryota
- Kingdom: Fungi
- Division: Ascomycota
- Class: Lecanoromycetes
- Order: Lecanorales
- Family: Parmeliaceae
- Genus: Imshaugia
- Species: I. sipmanii

Binomial name
- Imshaugia sipmanii Elix (2004)

Species of lichen

Imshaugia sipmanii is a species of saxicolous (rock-dwelling) lichen in the family Parmeliaceae. Found in Venezuela, it was formally described as a new species in 2004 by Australian lichenologist Jack Elix. The species epithet honours Dutch lichenologist Harrie Sipman, who collected the type specimen.
