= The Gateway Trip =

1990 anthology by Frederik Pohl

- Cover of the first edition, published by Del Rey Books. Art by Frank Kelly Freas.
- Author: Frederik Pohl
- Language: English
- Publisher: Del Rey Books
- Publication date: 1990

The Gateway Trip is a collection of science fiction "tales and vignettes", including a novella, by the American writer Frederik Pohl. It was published in 1990 by Del Rey Books. It involves one of Pohl's recurring creations, the Heechee universe. The Heechee are a fictional alien race which developed advanced technologies, including interstellar space travel, but then disappeared.

The book consists of nine new short stories published in the first three 1990 issues of Aboriginal Science Fiction, and "The Merchants of Venus". It is illustrated by Frank Kelly Freas.

== Contents ==
The book includes anecdotes and "...meditations on planetary and stellar physics, evolution, sociology, and the future of the human race" that "fill in the background of his Heechee novels". The story The Merchants of Venus is about Audee Walthers, an "airbody driver and tour operator", who scams Earth tourists who visit Venus. He needs a new liver, so he is seeking a rich client to profit from. He is pleased to meet the seemingly well-off Boyce Cochenour. However, Walthers finds out that Cochenour also needs money.

== Reception ==
Kirkus Reviews states that the book is "[m]ore history text than story", as the "...characters of the vignettes are barely seen shadows, a background for pure speculation." Kirkus Reviews states that "[d]espite the one novella and interesting science, ...this is only the skeleton of something better".
