= The Far Shore of Time =

1999 science fiction novel by Frederik Pohl

- Cover of the first edition
- Author: Frederik Pohl
- Cover artist: John Harris
- Language: English
- Series: The Eschaton Sequence
- Genre: Science fiction
- Publisher: Tor Books
- Publication date: July 1999
- Publication place: United States
- Media type: Print (Hardcover, Paperback)
- Pages: 317 (hardcover edition)
- ISBN: 0-312-86618-6
- OCLC: 41361398
- Dewey Decimal: 813/.54 21
- LC Class: PS3566.O36 F37 1999
- Preceded by: The Siege of Eternity

The Far Shore of Time is a 1999 science fiction novel by American writer Frederik Pohl. It concludes The Eschaton Sequence and the adventures of Dan Dannerman, an American government agent of the near future who becomes involved with the discovery of advanced and warring aliens.

== Plot ==
American government agent Dan Dannerman has been imprisoned, tortured, and repeatedly duplicated by his jailers, the "Beloved Leaders", a species that enslaves or destroys the other species they meet. The Far Shore of Time opens with the "Horch", rivals of the Beloved Leaders, occupying the zoo planet where Dannerman is being held captive. Dannerman is rescued, although initially the Horch treat him in much the same way the Beloved Leaders did: keeping him isolated and under interrogation. Eventually he is treated as a guest, given medical attention, and begins to make friends with the other freed prisoners.

Dannerman recovers from his ordeal and learns more about the Horch, the Beloved Leaders, and other species involved in their war. He collects information and technology, while looking for an opportunity to return to Earth and warn humanity about the coming of the Beloved Leaders. When Dannerman is asked to assist in preparing one of the former prisoners to infiltrate the Beloved Leaders he sees an opportunity to return home. He presents the plan to the Horch, and although they do not agree to it he is able to bluff his way through. He ends up back on Earth aboard one of the stealth submarines that the Beloved Leaders have placed on Earth.

Dannerman is able to make contact with his government, and discovers that they are already aware of the Beloved Leaders and are taking precautions against them. However, they are not aware of the stealthed submarines. Dannerman and his alien friends are again interrogated by the American government and representatives of the United Nations, although more gently than his previous interrogators. Dannerman must serve as a translator between the humans and the aliens, because he has a translation implant from the Horch.

With information from Dannerman and help from Horch technology, the Beloved Leader's submarines are cut off from their masters and captured before they are able to unleash pockets of undersea methane gas. This attack strategy is the Beloved Leaders standard practice for dealing with planets that will not submit to them. Having survived the initial contact, the President of the United States prepares to release all information about the aliens and the confrontation to the world, so that humanity can prepare to defend themselves in the future.
