= The Case Against Tomorrow =

1957 collection of science fiction stories by Frederik Pohl

- First edition cover
- Author: Frederik Pohl
- Cover artist: Richard M. Powers
- Language: English
- Genre: Science fiction
- Publisher: Ballantine Books
- Publication date: May 1957
- Publication place: United States

The Case Against Tomorrow is a collection of science fiction stories by American writer Frederik Pohl, first published by Ballantine Books in May 1957.

== Contents ==
- "The Midas Plague" (from Galaxy Science Fiction, April 1954)
- "The Census Takers" (The Magazine of Fantasy & Science Fiction, February 1956)
- "The Candle Lighter" (Galaxy Science Fiction, March 1955)
- "The Celebrated No-Hit Inning" (Fantastic Universe, September 1956)
- "Wapshot's Demon" (Science Fiction Stories, July 1956)
- "My Lady Green Sleeves" (Galaxy Science Fiction, February 1957)
