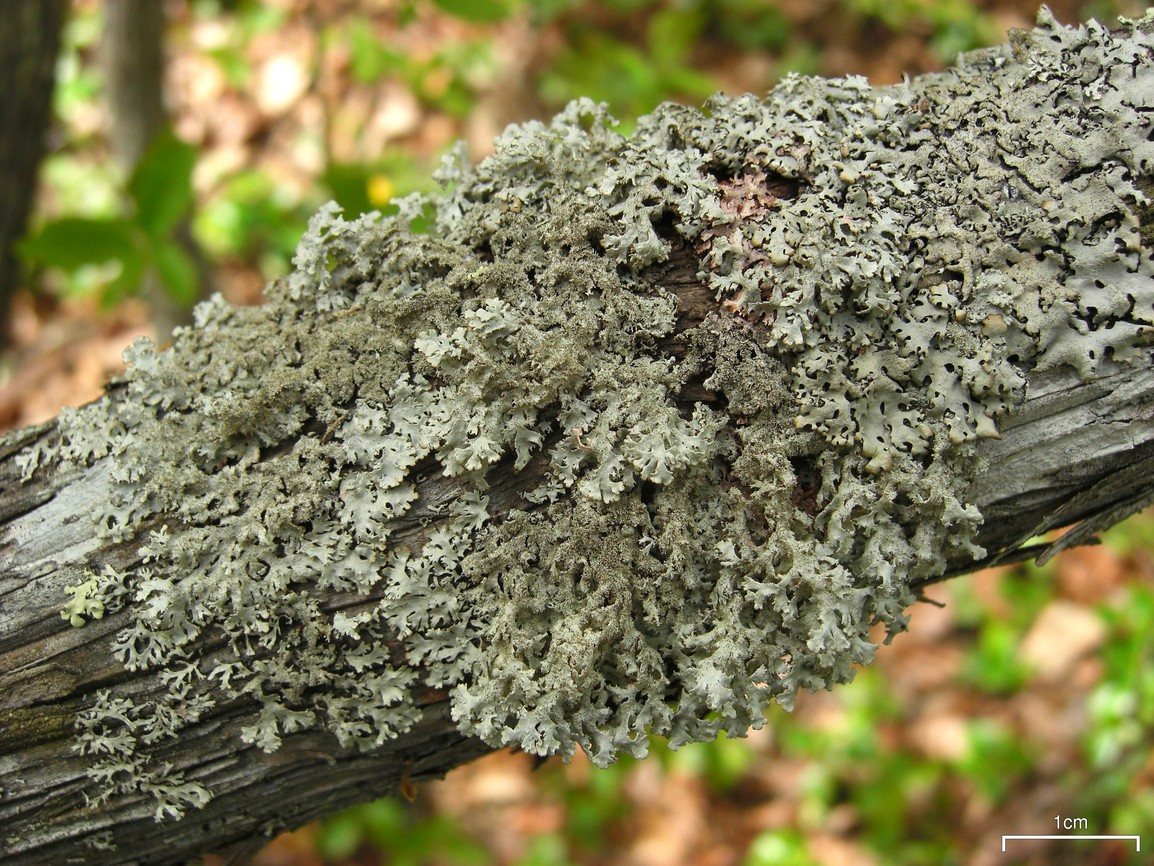

Conservation status
- Secure (NatureServe)

Scientific classification
- Kingdom: Fungi
- Division: Ascomycota
- Class: Lecanoromycetes
- Order: Lecanorales
- Family: Parmeliaceae
- Genus: Imshaugia
- Species: I. aleurites

Binomial name
- Imshaugia aleurites (Ach.) S.L.F.Mey. (1985)

Synonyms
- List: Lichen pallescens Neck. (1768); Lichen aleurites Ach. (1799); Parmelia aleurites (Ach.) Ach. (1803); Imbricaria aleurites (Ach.) DC. (1805); Squamaria aleurites (Ach.) Nyl. (1855); Parmeliopsis aleurites (Ach.) Nyl. (1866); Cetraria aleurites (Ach.) Th.Fr. (1871); Parmelia semirasa Nyl. (1873); Physcia semirasa Nyl. (1874)

= Imshaugia aleurites =

Species of lichen

Imshaugia aleurites, commonly known as the salted starburst lichen, is a species of foliose lichen in the family Parmeliaceae. It has a wide distribution in Europe and North America, and has also been recorded in China.

== Taxonomy ==
The lichen was first formally described by Swedish lichenologist Erik Acharius in his 1798 work Lichenographiae Sueciae Prodromus; he called it Lichen aleurites, as it was customary at the time, following the practice of Carl Linnaeus' influential work Species Plantarum, to place all lichens in the eponymously named genus Lichen. In 1985, Susan Meyer transferred it to Imshaugia, and assigned it as the type species of that newly circumscribed genus. In North America, it is commonly known as the salted starburst lichen.

== Description ==
The lichen has a whitish to pale gray thallus comprising lobes measuring 0.5–1.2 mm wide. The thallus is covered with cylindrical, brownish-tipped isidia, except at the tips of the lobes. The thallus undersurface is tan to whitish, and numerous short brown rhizines serves as holdfasts that attach the lichen to its substrate. Apothecia and pycnidia are rare in this species.

== Habitat and distribution ==
Imshaugia aleurites is widely distributed in Canada and the eastern United States, and grows in well-lit conifer forests on the bark or wood of conifers. Its range is also spread out over Europe, where it has been recorded in 32 countries. It was added to the lichen flora of mainland China in 1999.

== Species interactions ==
Tremella imshaugiae is a lichenicolous fungus that parasitizes Imshaugia aleurites. Infection by the fungus results in the formation of small amber-coloured basidiomata on the thallus surface. It has been found growing on I. aleurites lichen thalli in Scotland and Maine.
