= The Age of the Pussyfoot =

1966 novel by Frederik Pohl

- Cover of first hardcover edition (Trident Press, 1969)
- Author: Frederik Pohl
- Cover artist: Robert Foster
- Language: English
- Genre: Science fiction
- Publisher: Trident Press
- Publication date: October 1969
- Publication place: United States
- Media type: Print (hardback & paperback)
- Pages: 212

The Age of the Pussyfoot is a science fiction novel by American writer Frederik Pohl, first published as a serial in Galaxy Science Fiction in three parts, starting in October 1965. It was later published by Trident Press as a standalone novel in 1969.

== Plot ==
Charles Dalgleish Forrester is revived from cryopreservation in the year 2527, having been killed in a fire in 1969. Thanks to his insurance, after the expenses of his revival are paid he has a quarter of a million dollars, a fortune in his eyes. He can afford the luxuries of 26th century life, such as a joymaker, a scepter-like portable computer terminal with some extra features, like a drug dispenser.

After a night of heavy partying, with some distant memory of an argument with somebody, he wakes in his new apartment and checks in with his joymaker. It informs him that he has a message from a woman whose name he does not recognize, and that someone called Heinzlichen Jura de Syrtis Major has taken out a hunting license on him. Baffled, he eventually encounters the woman from the party who he believes is called Tip. She maintains she is Adne Bensen, the woman whose messages he has been ignoring. Apparently she got on so well with Forrester that she is ready to begin a relationship. She takes him back to her apartment, where he finds she has two children, around eight years old, who seem somewhat precocious for their years. With names like "Tunt" and "Mim" flying around, he mistakenly assumes those are the children's names, baffling them when he uses them that way.

Later Forrester encounters Heinzlichen with a few friends, who without much ado beat him up so badly he goes to the hospital. It transpires that Heinzlichen's hunting license allows him to kill Forrester providing he pays for the revival, and the whole vendetta is over some insult at the party, which Forrester can barely remember, possibly treading on Heinzlichen's foot. Since Heinzlichen is from Mars and is adapted to low gravity, this is a major faux pas.

Mistake follows on mistake, compounding his confusion. Forrester comes to believe that Adne is attempting to entrap him in fatherhood, presumably for his money, when she leaves a message saying that "we have to choose a name". He is equally disdainful of a friend who keeps asking him to join his Club, expecting that also to be just a ruse to get at his money.

Eventually Adne sets him straight. Firstly, he will go broke soon because, unbeknownst to him, all the 20th century foods he likes are very expensive, as are all the other joymaker functions he enjoys. He needs to get a high-paying job. Secondly, the "name" she was asking about was a "reciprocal name," one used only between two close friends or intimates. Each uses it only to address the other, as "Tunt" was the children's name for each other, and "Mim" was the name used between Adne and the children. Tip was the name she and another close friend used, so Forrester could not use it. The friend wanting Forrester to join his Club was in fact offering him a paying position in the organization, though Forrester is not sure he likes what the Club stands for.

However, Forrester's woes are not over. He first takes a high-paying job for what turns out to be an alien. The alien is known to all as a Sirian, but only because that is the star system in which he was captured (Sirius). Earth is preparing for a Sirian attack. When the alien ship was first encountered, the Earth ship shot first and asked questions later. The only thing stopping an attack, it is believed, is that the Sirian's home world population has no idea where Earth is. The captured Sirians live on Earth in a state of virtual house arrest, with their movements restricted and monitored. Forrester's job is to be the Sirian's guide to Earth culture and history, and he is paid handsomely for it. Unfortunately Adne and the others shun him for working for the alien. The Sirian asks many questions about seemingly arbitrary topics of human history. When Forrester fails to respond in time, he is promptly fired.

He then takes a high-paying job which is an apparent sinecure, watching over some machinery, until he learns that all the previous holders of the post are in cryopreservation after being blasted with radiation. Against the warnings of the joymaker, he quits in the middle of a shift. In this time, this is a huge error, and all his funds are taken in fines. He is forced to live with all the other bums on Skid Row.

The existence is actually quite comfortable. Nobody can afford a joymaker, but rich passersby give money to panhandlers, and there are cash-only eating places with coin-operated joymakers at the tables. However, there are also people looking for thrills on the cheap, wanting to kill someone without having to pay for their revival. After a near-miss, he runs into the Sirian again, who drugs and hypnotizes him. Under the delusion that he is helping Adne take a trip, Forrester places the Sirian in control of a spacecraft.

The ship heads into space and escapes, but not before the whole world learns that the alien has escaped, though not Forrester's role in the affair. The entire population goes into a panic. Most commit suicide in order to hide in the cryopreservation banks. Heinzlichen comes after Forrester one more time, and Forrester kills him. This was simply Heinzlichen's way of getting into a freezer. Eventually Forrester is almost alone.

At this point, the Club he had been asked to join goes into action. They are a 26th-century version of Luddites bent on dismantling the world's technological base by subverting central computing systems, believing this will improve human welfare. Ominously, they are "helped" by the Sirians. In the end, medical technicians and the Luddites are the only people left awake. Forrester learns about the conspiracy. Forrester cannot reach the technicians because all the computer terminals have been programmed against him. His only hope is to kill himself. He walks up to one of the automated medics, and cuts his throat. Fortunately the medic, reacting to its programming to save lives over that set up by the Luddites, gets him to a medical facility, and he is able to abort the revolution. Eventually people start being revived, and he is reunited with Adne.

== Characters ==
- Charles Dalgliesh Forrester is a man born in 1931, lived until 1969, than is revived in 2527. He initially believes he is rich because he has a quarter of a million dollars in his investment, a considerable amount at the time of writing. He eventually discovers that although that amount would have supported him comfortably in a 20th-century lifestyle, his use of the joymaker and all that it can bring him means that he is rapidly running out of money.
- Adne Bensen is a liberated 26th century woman. She styles herself as "natural flow", meaning that she does not use artificial hormones and is only receptive to men at certain times. She is quite open about this, much to Forrester's chagrin. Her profession is that of "Reacter". This means that she is employed as a consultant of sorts, giving her response to consumer products, and is rated by the number of potential customers she represents, and the chance that a favorable reaction from her will mean that the product is going to sell that many copies. She has two children, who are equally frank about her emotional and physical needs.
- Heinzlichen Jura de Syrtis Major is a Martian colonist visiting Earth. He speaks English with a strong accent that Forrester identifies as German, though Heinzlichen insists that all Martians speak that way because the thinner atmosphere on Mars eliminates some of the higher audio frequencies. He also has no idea what "German" signifies. He takes out a "hunting license" on Forrester because of a perceived insult when Forrester accidentally stepped on his feet during a party. The license is very expensive, requiring Heinzlichen to post bonds and undertake not to damage Forrester's brain, as well as paying all medical costs. In the later sections of the novel, Forrester encounters another Martian, Kevin O'Rourke na Solis Lacis, who also sounds "German" to Forrester despite his Irish name, and who also has no idea what is meant by "German", or "Irish".

== Inspiration ==
The novel was inspired by Pohl's own experiences in a local volunteer fire department and by the early computer time sharing systems, along with advances in medicine, such as transplants, extrapolated to the point where anyone with enough money can command huge resources and essentially live forever. There are some unusual social consequences of these advances, however.

== Joymaker ==
The story's joymaker bears a remarkable resemblance to devices in common use in the years following the start of the 21st century.

The remote-access computer transponder called the "joymaker" is your most valuable single possession in your new life. If you can imagine a combination of telephone, credit card, alarm clock, pocket bar, reference library, and full-time secretary, you will have sketched some of the functions provided by your joymaker. - from the novel

It was conceived by Pohl in the 1960s after he saw one of the earliest time sharing computer systems. These allowed multiple users spread over a wide area, connected by good quality telephone or data lines, to simultaneously use one or more large (for the time) computers for a variety of purposes.

In its basic form, the Joymaker is a remote time-sharing terminal which uses radio communications instead of wire lines, and interacts with its user via voice rather than a keyboard and text output. It is small and light enough to be worn or carried, resembling in some cases a small sceptre. It can also dispense various medications, stimulants etc. from reservoirs within it.

The story concerns a 20th-century man placed in what came to be called cryopreservation, revived in the 25th century, and coming to terms with life in an era of massive computer power, accessed via the Joymaker. Unlike early 21st century portable devices, the Joymaker has little or no innate computing power.

The Joymaker has the following uses :

- Access to basic computing power, for money management etc.
- Access to libraries at any time, in any place.
- Educating children, each of whom has a special Joymaker.
- Health - the Joymaker can sense heartbeat, respiration etc. and the central computer can order it to dispense medication, or it can send help.
- Message Store and forward, later known as voice mail. This becomes the bedrock of social interaction in the story.
- Ordering food and drink, whether at home or in public. All payment is done using the central computer.
- Ordering other goods for delivery. Since payment is automatic, the expense of items is not always apparent to the buyers. The protagonist rapidly depletes his "fortune".
- Public Address system - any group of people can hear a public announcement on their Joymakers, removing the need for loudspeakers in public places.
- Locating people. The central computer can track the position of any Joymaker, and by extension, its owner. This information can be made available at the owner's discretion.
- Jobs not requiring physical presence. One character is a "Reacter," someone who samples new products and reports her reactions using the Joymaker. The central computer analyzes her reactions in the light of her known psychological makeup and is able to statistically predict how well the product will sell.

=== Relation to actual devices ===
Pohl himself, in an afterword to the novel, made the following statement about the world he foresaw: "I do not really think it will be that long. Not five centuries. Perhaps not even five decades."

Forty years after the publication of the novel, most people of 2005 would recognize the functions of the Joymaker in the cellphone, laptop computer, and personal digital assistant. By 2015 the ubiquitous smartphones provided most of the functions in a single package.

Only the medical capabilities are missing from devices carried by people in industrialized nations in the early 21st century. These devices, however usually have far more computing power than the Joymaker as conceived, and more even than the 1960s mainframe computers that provided the inspiration. Some of the actual social effects of portable communication and computing parallel those predicted in the novel.

== See also ==
- Barlowe's Guide to Extraterrestrials
