= The World at the End of Time =

Novel by Frederik Pohl

- Cover of first edition (hardcover)
- Author: Frederik Pohl
- Language: English
- Genre: Science fiction
- Publisher: Del Rey Books
- Publication date: June 1, 1990
- Publication place: United States
- Media type: Print (hardback & paperback)
- Pages: 393
- ISBN: 0-345-33976-2
- OCLC: 20798288
- Dewey Decimal: 813/.54 20
- LC Class: PS3566.O36 W67 1990

World at the End of Time is a 1990 hard science fiction novel by American writer Frederik Pohl. It tells the parallel stories of a human and a plasma-based intelligence who manage to survive to the time near the heat death of the universe. The book is thus a combined work in speculative cosmology and space colonization.

== Plot summary ==
World at the End of Time follows the story of a young Earth-born human, Viktor Sorricaine, on a colony expedition to a distant star system. The colonists are frozen for the long trip between stars. Unknown to both the humans of Earth and the colonists, the stars around them are home to immensely long-lived (effectively immortal) plasma creatures—with no knowledge of, or interest in, the activities of insignificant matter creatures.

Wan-To, one of the oldest and most powerful plasma creatures, is engaged in a war. After creating modified copies of himself, or "children", for company, Wan-To finds himself in a deadly game of chess with them. The "board" is the entire galaxy and the weapons are the stars themselves. Each star may be home to an enemy "child"; using a variety of exotic particles, Wan-To is able to cause a targeted star to flare and kill any enemy that may be living within it. Some time after the colonists have left Earth, its own sun falls victim to the war, being made to explode with humanity on Earth being destroyed as collateral damage. The colonists are thus the only humans left.

Into the middle of this battlefield, the three colony ships (Ark, New Mayflower and Argosy) unwittingly head for their new home. Upon arriving, the colony begins to establish itself ... only to discover that their entire local group of stars appears to be undergoing a bizarre acceleration, and are dimming. After a disastrous disease outbreak and terraforming failures, the desperate colonists eventually decide to investigate the strange radiation emissions from a small world within their solar system.

Upon arriving in orbit, their ship is badly damaged and Viktor is forced into the onboard freezer systems. They are eventually rescued and unfrozen four hundred of the colony's years later, to find the colony in an even more desperate situation. The star around which the colony's world orbits has dimmed considerably (owing to the energy being siphoned off to accelerate it) and they are now travelling so fast that, because of relativistic effects, the universe around them has shrunk to a bright dot. The colony has become factionalized and heavily religious, with scientific investigation discouraged.

Viktor is eventually frozen again for attempting to investigate why they have been accelerating. He wakes four thousand of the colony's years later, to find the far descendants of the colony have rebuilt their society into habitats closely orbiting the dim star (a brown dwarf) and created a high-technology civilization dedicated to pleasure and comfort. He makes his way, eventually, to the former colony to find only a few fellow-colonists unfrozen and attempting to rebuild it. His unique status as someone who was born on "old Earth" brings publicity to their efforts and the rebuilding forges ahead.

During the four thousand years of Viktor's frozen sleep, the star system has been slowed again. After the vast amount of time that has passed, all that remains of the once young universe are dead stars and black holes, with Wan-To desperately surviving on the energy provided by proton decay. Wan-To receives a tachyon transmission from his long-forgotten systems and makes preparations to move into these last remaining stars — believing that the small matter creatures inhabiting the system are irrelevant and can be destroyed as a result should they become an irritation.
