= Man Plus =

1976 science fiction novel by Frederik Pohl

- Cover of first edition (hardcover)
- Author: Frederik Pohl
- Cover artist: Paul Gamarello
- Language: English
- Genre: Science fiction
- Publisher: Random House
- Publication date: 1976
- Publication place: United States
- Media type: Print (hardback & paperback)
- Pages: 215
- ISBN: 0-394-48676-5
- OCLC: 2020835
- Dewey Decimal: 813/.5/4
- LC Class: PZ4.P748 Man PS3566.O36
- Followed by: Mars Plus, 1994

Man Plus is a 1976 science fiction novel by American writer Frederik Pohl. It won the Nebula Award for Best Novel in 1976, was nominated for the Hugo and Campbell Awards, and placed third in the annual Locus Poll in 1977. The story is about a cyborg, Roger Torraway, who is designed to operate in the harsh Martian environment so that humans can colonize Mars.

== Plot ==
In the not-too-distant future, the Cold War threatens to turn into a fighting war. Colonization of Mars seems to be mankind's only hope of surviving certain Armageddon. To facilitate this, the US government begins a cyborg program to create a being capable of surviving the harsh Martian environment: Man Plus. After the death of the first candidate, due to the project supervisors forgetting to enhance his brain's ability to process sensory input to cope with the new stimuli he is receiving, Roger Torraway becomes the heart of the program.

To survive in the thin Martian atmosphere, Roger Torraway's body must be replaced with an artificial one. At every step he becomes more and more disconnected from humanity, unable to feel things in his new body. It is only after arriving on Mars that his new body begins to make sense to him. It is perfectly adapted to this new world and he becomes perfectly separated from his old world and from humanity.

The success of the Martian mission spurs similar cyborg programs in other spacefaring nations. It is revealed that the computer networks of Earth have become sentient and that ensuring humanity's survival will guarantee theirs as well. In the end, the network is puzzled; something has distorted their extrapolations, the same way they influenced humanity.

== Reception ==
New York Times reviewer Gerald Jonas received the novel unfavorably, saying "Pohl seems to have lost his touch entirely. . . . the social extrapolation in Man Plus is simple-minded and the irony heavy-handed." Spider Robinson found Man Plus to be "tight, suspenseful, at times gruesomely fascinating," but faulted it for "one dumptruck-sized hole" in its plotting.

C. Ben Ostrander reviewed Man Plus in The Space Gamer No. 8. Ostrander commented that he "recommends this book for all those who enjoy fast paced, action stories".

== Sequel ==
Pohl teamed up with Thomas T. Thomas to write a sequel, Mars Plus, published in 1994.
