= Homegoing (Pohl novel) =

1989 novel by Frederik Pohl

- First edition
- Author: Frederik Pohl
- Cover artist: Barclay Shaw
- Language: English
- Genre: Science fiction
- Publisher: Del Rey Books
- Publication date: 1989
- Publication place: United States
- Media type: Print
- Pages: 279 (first edition)
- OCLC: 20678068

Homegoing is a science fiction novel by American author Frederik Pohl, first published in 1989 by Del Rey Books. The novel was one of the nominees for the Locus SF Award, one of the awards of the Hugo Awards.

== Plot summary ==
The protagonist, Lysander (Sandy) Washington, has been raised by aliens, the Hakh'hli. When their interstellar ship arrives at Earth, Sandy serves as part of the aliens' liaison team with Earth. Pohl uses Sandy's alien perspective to make some observations about our culture.

Sandy believes his alien friends are peaceful and benevolent, as they present themselves to be. However, after it becomes clear their plans are far from benevolent, Sandy has to decide whether to side with the aliens who raised him, who are the only family he knows, or to side with humanity. This decision becomes more complicated when he learns he is only partially human.
