= The Other End of Time =

1996 science fiction novel by Frederik Pohl

First edition (publ. Tor Books) Cover art by John Harris

The Other End of Time is a 1996 science fiction novel by American writer Frederik Pohl. It is the first novel in The Eschaton Sequence, which is about the adventures of Dan Dannerman, an American government agent of the near future who becomes involved with the discovery of advanced and warring aliens. The novel is about Dannerman and a small group of people who explore an abandoned space station, only to find themselves abducted by aliens who use them for experiments.

== Plot ==
The novel is set in the near future, in a world in which the United States is struggling with many problems, including weapons of mass destruction, ecological damage, crime and hyperinflation. Then strange messages from space aliens are received. Dr. Pat Adcock has a theory that the aliens have taken up the old Starlab space station. Adcock recruits pilots Jimmy Lin and Martin Delasquez, an elderly astronomer (Rosaleen Artzybachova), and close protection agent Dan Dannerman (who is actually a government secret agent).

When they first explore the Starlab, they find strange alien technologies. Then suddenly, they are transported through space. The aliens have kidnapped the group because the aliens, called "Beloved Leaders", are battling against a terrorist named the Horch. The aliens are battling for dominance of the "Eschaton", which gives eternal life. The humans then learn that they are just copies of their old bodies; their real bodies were sent back to the Earth with wiped memories. Other copies have been experimented on with vivisection.

== Reception ==
Kirkus Reviews praises Pohl for taking "...a hoary science fiction cliche--alien abduction--and turn[ing] it on its head." Kirkus Reviews calls the novel an "...impeccably crafted, absorbing, and enjoyable reworking of mostly familiar material that, while satisfyingly self-contained, seems perfectly poised for sequels."
