= The Martian Star-Gazers =

- Short story by Frederik Pohl using pseudonym Ernst Mason
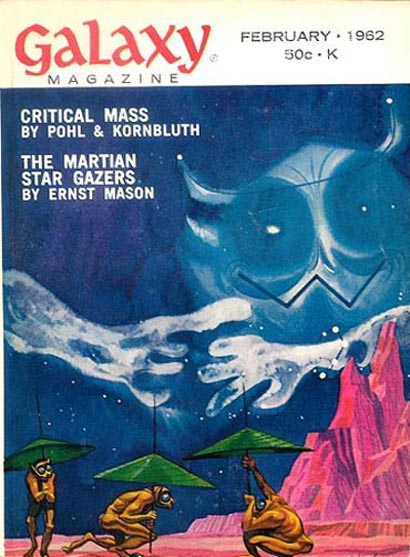
- Country: USA
- Language: English
- Genre: Science fiction

Publication
- Published in: Galaxy Science Fiction
- Publication type: Periodical
- Media type: Print (Magazine)
- Publication date: February 1962

The Martian Star-Gazers is a humorous parody article first published in the American magazine Galaxy Science Fiction in February 1962. Written by Frederik Pohl, it appeared under the pseudonym "Ernst Mason". The following year, it was included in Pohl's collection The Abominable Earthman.

The article is written from the point of view of an anthropologist studying the extinct culture of Mars. Among the artifacts discovered by explorers from Earth were many items that resembled umbrellas.

The writer explains that this was due to the Martian interpretation of the Milky Way and related constellations of their southern sky, which was visible from the places where their civilization arose. They came to believe that one constellation near their South Celestial pole was a malevolent being they called "Old Grabby" and that the visible portion of the galaxy represented his hands and arms. The Magellanic Clouds looked like eyes and were known as "The Peepers". The bright stars Canopus and Achernar represented horns on Old Grabby's head. The Southern Cross represented a manacle on one wrist, and the other hand was trying to reach across and break the manacle. When this happened, they believed, Old Grabby would descend and destroy them.

The superstition became so strong that Martians carried umbrellas to shield themselves from the sky. In time, their civilization moved north to a point where Old Grabby was no longer visible, and they ceased to carry the umbrellas. However, they could not help but notice the resemblance of the constellation Cassiopeia to the mouth of Old Grabby. Martians had a cleft jaw which gave their mouths a characteristic "W" shape which they naturally transferred to their mythical beings. Not far away was the Martian North pole star, Delta Cephei, which is a variable star. Its changing brightness was likened to the breathing of a Sleeper. Nebulae such as the Orion Nebula were likened to wounds suffered in some battle.

However, centuries before human explorers arrived, the supernova known as Tycho's Star occurred just above Cassiopeia, looking to Martians like an opened eye. From their point of view, the Sleeper was awake, Old Grabby or a relative had found them, and they were doomed. Effectively, their entire culture committed suicide.
