= The Gold at the Starbow's End =

1972 novella by Frederik Pohl

- Short story by Frederik Pohl
- Country: USA
- Language: English
- Genre: Science fiction

Publication
- Published in: Analog
- Publication type: Periodical
- Publisher: Condé Nast
- Media type: Magazine
- Publication date: March 1972

"The Gold at the Starbow's End" is a science fiction novella by American writer Frederik Pohl. Originally published in the March 1972 issue of Analog Science Fiction/Science Fact, it was nominated for both the 1973 Hugo Award for Best Novella and the 1973 Nebula Award for Best Novella. It won the 1973 Locus Award for Best Novella.

Writing in The Encyclopedia of Science Fiction, John Clute and Brian Stableford noted that Pohl's longer work had greatly improved after he stopped being the editor of Galaxy Magazine and the Worlds of If in 1969. They considered "The Gold at the Starbow's End" to be an important transitional work leading to his better-known work of the late 1970s and 1980s. As the editor of Platinum Pohl (a collection of Pohl's work), James Frenkel described "The Gold at the Starbow's End" as a "wild adventure" that also addressed "the conflict between the needs of science and the exigencies of balancing a budget".

Pohl later expanded the novella into a full-length novel, which was published in 1982 under the title Starburst.

== Plot summary ==
The story is told with two narrative devices—reports from members of the crew of the US Starship Constitution alternating with a traditional third-person narration of the activities back on Earth. The main protagonist of the activities on Earth is Dr. Dieter von Knefhausen, the scientist in charge of the US space program.

In the first report from the starship, the reader learns that the ship is approximately one month into a multi-year journey to the Alpha Centauri star system, where the crew will begin colonization of the planet Alpha-Aleph. Already, the crew is finding they have too much free time and have begun filling that time by studying various mathematics problems. In the first narration of the action on Earth, the reader learns that society has become dystopian. The possibility of colonizing Alpha-Aleph is a source of hope for a better future.

As the story progresses, the reader is told that the existence of the planet Alpha-Aleph is a hoax, perpetrated not only on the American people but also on the crew of the starship. The true purpose of the mission is to place the crew in a position where they will have nothing to do other than study mathematics. The hoax was the idea of Knefhausen, who believes that, if deprived of any other means of recreation, the crew will succeed in making scientific breakthroughs that will then be broadcast back to Earth. Knefhausen's theory proves true, but he learns that the crew quickly becomes bored with technological applications of their newfound mathematical prowess. Instead, they become increasingly interested in using it to develop their understanding of art and philosophy. These new understandings give the crew an unusual control over the physical universe and, by the end of the story, they have achieved god-like powers.

Two recurring mathematical themes in the story are Carnap-Ramsey sentences and Godel encoding.

The word "starbow" in the story's title is a word coined by one of the characters on the starship. It refers to the rainbow-like effect seen when stars are undergoing a relativistic Doppler effect.

== Extension to novel length ==
In the novel the crew of the Constitution exact revenge on Earth by sending a beam of "strange" particles back to the home planet, causing all nuclear materials to melt down harmlessly, reducing the population to poverty in the absence of nuclear power. The last section relates the events surrounding the return of the crew's children to Earth.

== Publication history ==
Shortly after its original appearance in Analog Science Fiction/Science Fact, "The Gold at the Starbow's End" became the title story of a collection of Pohl's works. It also appeared in two best-of-the-year anthologies: Best Science Fiction of 1972 (for which Pohl was the editor) and The 1973 Annual World's Best SF.

Since then, it has been anthologized at least six times, including one in Italian translation (under the title "Alpha Aleph"). The story also appears in two collections devoted to Pohl's work: the already-mentioned The Gold at the Starbow's End (1972) and Platinum Pohl (2005).

== Short story collection ==
The Gold at the Starbow's End is a collection of Pohl's stories published in the United States and Canada by Ballantine Books in August 1972. It was published in Britain by Gollancz Science Fiction in June 1973, followed by a paperback edition from Panther Books in January 1975. Contents are as follows:

- "The Gold at the Starbow's End", 1972
- "Sad Solarian Screenwriter Sam", 1972
- "Call Me Million", 1970
- "Shaffery Among the Immortals", 1972
- "The Merchants of Venus", 1972
