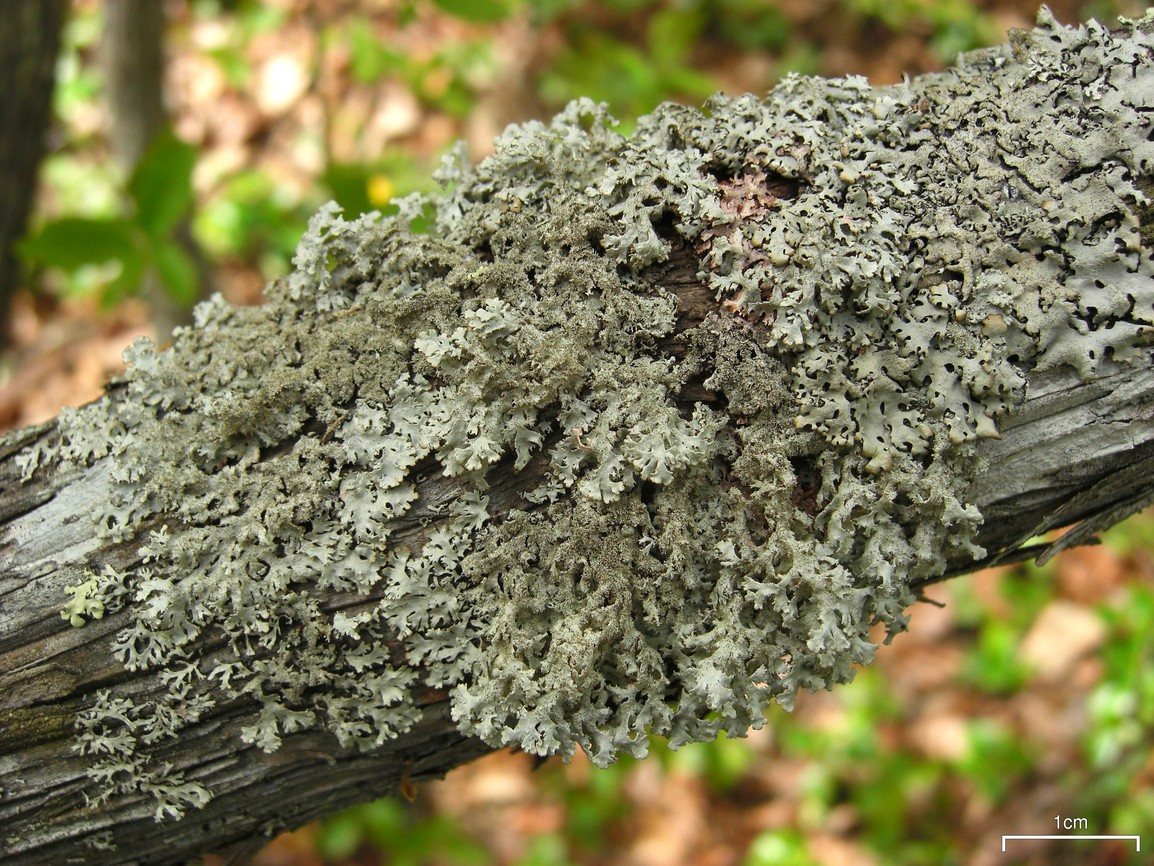
- Imshaugia aleurites in the Great Smoky Mountains, North Carolina. Scale bar is 1 cm

Scientific classification
- Domain: Eukaryota
- Kingdom: Fungi
- Division: Ascomycota
- Class: Lecanoromycetes
- Order: Lecanorales
- Family: Parmeliaceae
- Genus: Imshaugia; S.L.F.Mey. (1985)

Type species
- Imshaugia aleurites (Ach.) S.L.F.Mey. (1985)

Species
- I. aleurites I. angustior I. evernica I. placorodia I. pyxiniformis I. sipmanii I. venezolana

= Imshaugia =

Genus of lichens

Imshaugia is a genus of seven species of foliose lichens in the family Parmeliaceae. They are commonly known as starburst lichens.

== Taxonomy ==
The genus was circumscribed by Susan Meyer in 1985 as a segregate of Parmeliopsis. In a previous study of Parmeliopsis, Meyer noted a group of species (represented by P. aleurites and P. placorodia) that would be better accommodated in a separate genus. This had been previously noted by other lichenologists: in 1932, Vilmos Gyelnik proposed the section Pallidifera to include the grey species of Parmeliopsis; in 1936 Johannes Hillmann proposed section Rectoconidia to contain species with short and straight conidia. Meyer created Imshaugia on the basis of its emergent and partly marginal pycnidia (they are immersed and laminal in Parmeliopsis), its short, ampulliform (flask-shaped) or bifusiform (tapering at both ends) conidia (these are long and curved in Parmeliopsis), and the presence of Cetraria-type lichenan in its cell walls rather than isolichenan as in Parmeliopsis.

The generic name honours the American lichenologist Henry Andrew Imshaug (1925–2010), "in recognition of his contributions to lichenology." Imshaugia species are commonly known as "starburst lichens".

== Description ==
Imshaugia lichens are foliose with a mineral-grey to whitish-grey thallus and a whitish to light brown lower surface. They grow as small rosettes, comprising small lobes measuring 1–2 mm wide. Pseudocyphellae and soredia are absent from the thallus, but isidia may be present. The upper cortex is paraplectenchymatous (a cell arrangement where the hyphae are oriented in all directions), measuring 10–20 μm thick, and covered by an epicortex with pores.

The apothecia are of the Lecanora-type, resembling large, concave brown discs. Ascospores are colourless, ellipsoid, and number eight per ascus. Conidia have a short bacilliform shape with a swelling towards one end, and measure 3–4.5 μm long. The phycobiont in Imshaugia is green algae – Trebouxia in I. aleurites, and Myrmecia in I. placorodia. The thallus contains thamnolic acid and atranorin.

== Habitat and distribution ==
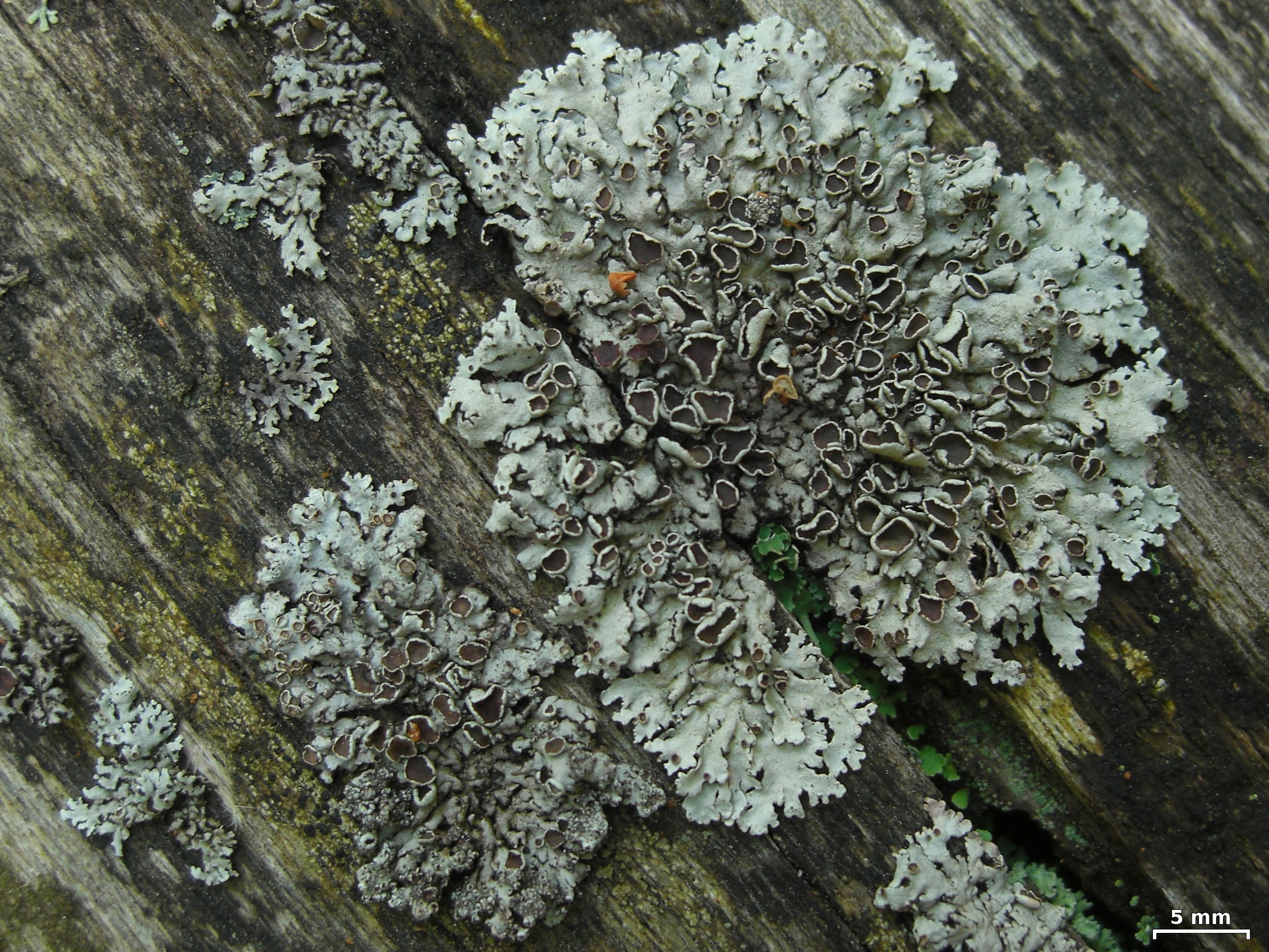
Imshaugia placorodia, photographed in the Black Hills of South Dakota. Scale bar is 5 mm

Imshaugia grows most commonly on the bark and wood of conifers, and prefers woodland habitats that are open and well-lit. They have also been recorded on hardwoods and wood fences. The South American species I. sipmanii, however, is saxicolous. Imshaugia placorodia has been noted to display a preference for the bark of the tree species pitch pine (Pinus rigida) and Jack pine (Pinus banksiana). The type species, Imshaugia aleurites, is widely distributed in northern North America, having been recorded from the tree line in the Arctic south through all of the boreal region and most of the temperate region.

== Species ==
Species Fungorum (in the Catalogue of Life) accept six species of Imshaugia.

- Imshaugia aleurites (Ach.) S.L.F.Mey. (1985)
- Imshaugia angustior (Nyl.) Sipman (2021)
- Imshaugia evernica (Elix & J.Johnst.) Elix (1993) – New South Wales
- Imshaugia placorodia (Ach.) S.L.F.Mey. (1985)
- Imshaugia pyxiniformis Elix (2004) – Brazil
- Imshaugia sipmanii Elix (2004) – Venezuela
- Imshaugia venezolana (Hale) Elix (2004) – Venezuela

The species Imshaugia subarida, proposed by John Elix in 2004 (a new combination from genus Canoparmelia), has since been transferred to Austroparmelina.
