= A Plague of Pythons =

1962 novel by Frederik Pohl

First edition, published by Ballantine Books. Cover art by Richard M. Powers

A Plague of Pythons is a science fiction novel by American writer Frederik Pohl. Serialized in Galaxy Science Fiction in October and December 1962, the novel was published in 1965, and an updated version was published in 1984 under the title Demon in the Skull. The title derives from the words "Domina Pythonis" used as part of an exorcism ritual performed in the first chapter to scare away the "demons" that seem to possess people in the novel.

== Plot outline ==
The novel opens in a world reduced to a grim struggle for existence after a plague of madness that afflicted individuals at random. Some two years previously, every government in the world was attacked by its own military machinery, which then self-destructed. All civilian air transport was similarly destroyed, along with major cities like San Francisco. After the initial meltdown, people began claiming to be "possessed". They would commit crimes of violence, but afterward they would claim to have had no control over their actions. This leads to superstitions about demonic possession, as well as a novel legal defense.

Chandler is an electronics engineer who is on trial for rape and murder. He claims to have been possessed while committing the crime, but nobody believes him because it took place in a pharmaceuticals plant. These places, along with hospitals and other vital facilities, are believed to have some kind of immunity to the plague. Saved by an apparent episode of possession of the jury in the trial, he is instead exiled from his community with a letter "H", for "Hoaxer", branded on his forehead.

He encounters a cult who use pain to ward off the possession. The members believe that the "flame spirits" cannot abide pain, but a young woman tells Chandler that she is sure the possessors are other human beings, and that one of them is a man she rejected. Soon afterwards the entire cult is wiped out and Chandler, in a state of almost constant possession, is made to bring their sacred text, a copy of The Prophet by Khalil Gibran, to Hawaii. On the way he encounters people who, while not always possessed, do what their "execs" tell them for fear of the consequences of disobeying.

In Hawaii Chandler learns that the possessors are indeed people. They wear silver coronets which give them the power, using a new technology. Based on what the novel calls "sub-millimeter microwaves" (now known as terahertz radiation), the technology allows people wearing the coronets to locate and take over the bodies of anyone on Earth. Chandler falls under the influence of Rosalie Pan, a former Broadway star who was kidnapped by her ex-lover and eventually allowed to become one of the execs herself. She tries to seduce him into joining her by giving him a taste of the feeling of power.

At the same time, the execs are building a new transmitter on the island of Kauai. While they can go anywhere on Earth with their power, their physical bodies must remain close to the original equipment. With the new equipment they will be able to leave Hawaii and roam at will. Chandler's expertise is needed and he is proposed for election to the elite. If not, once the job is done he will be eliminated. Chandler for his part has conflicting feelings. He is beginning to enjoy the benefits of his situation while at the same time trying to find a way to stop the execs.

Matters come to a head when Rosalie's lover, Andrei, one of the leaders of the execs, attempts to kill Chandler out of jealousy, only to collapse from a stroke due to physical deterioration after years of vicarious living in the bodies of others. Chandler grabs Andrei's coronet and changes the frequency it operates on. He then disables the old equipment and uses the only functioning coronet through the Kauai backup installation to track down and kill the other execs including Rosalie. Once he is the only one left, he promises himself to stop using it after cleaning up some final "loose ends", but he knows he is lying.

== Reception ==
SF Impulse reviewer Tom Boardman Jr. characterized the novel as "good, but not Pohl at his superlative best."
