= Mars Plus =

1994 science fiction novel by Frederik Pohl and Thomas T. Thomas

- First edition (publ. Baen Books); Cover art by Stephen Hickman
- Author: Frederik Pohl, Thomas T. Thomas
- Language: English
- Publisher: Baen Books
- Publication date: 1994
- Dewey Decimal: 813.54
- LC Class: PS3566.O36 M37

Mars Plus is a 1994 science fiction novel by American writer Frederik Pohl and Thomas T. Thomas. It is the sequel to Pohl's 1976 novel Man Plus, which is about a cyborg, Roger Torraway, who is designed to operate in the harsh Martian environment, so that humans can start to colonize Mars. Mars Plus is set fifty years after the first novel. Young Demeter Coghlan travels to Mars, now settled by humans and cyborgs, and finds herself amidst a rebellion by the colonists.

== Plot ==
In Man Plus, set in the not-too-distant future, with threat of the Cold War becoming a fighting war, people plan for the colonization of Mars to escape the seemingly-inevitable Armageddon. The American government begins a cyborg program to create a being capable of surviving the harsh Martian environment: a "Man Plus" called Roger Torraway who is converted from man to cyborg. While his cyborg body is adapted to Mars, he feels strange at first. As more nations develop cyborgs, the computer networks of Earth become sentient.

Mars Plus is set fifty years after the first novel, when Mars is settled by humans and cyborgs. The cyborg Torroway is in the novel, but he is not the main character. The protagonist is Demeter Coghlan, a young woman from Earth who travels to Mars. Demeter is seeking information about a canyon that she believes may be significant if the colonists begin to convert Mars to an Earth-like planet. Amidst a backdrop of spies and newly dispatched Earth diplomats, the inexperienced Demeter senses that tensions are rising on the planet. She is further disoriented due to recovering from an accident. Despite the risks in the region, Demeter has intense sexual encounters with some of the local colonists. When the locals rebel against the surveillance set up by the computer network, Demeter is kidnapped by the computer network.

== Reception ==
The reviewer from SFBook Reviews criticizes the book, saying "nothing really happens" and stating that there is no linkage to Man Plus apart from the presence of the cyborg Torraway; moreover, the reviewer states that the questions posed in the first novel are not answered.

SF Reviews calls Mars Plus "...not as good as Man Plus but...not bad", and it is praised for "...some nice touches: Demeter continuously forgetting to think about geology; her careless dictation to the computer and her irresistible urges for wild sex." SF Reviews criticizes the writing in Mars Plus for being "...a little careless in places" and in need of more "...more crafting and pruning."
