= Tomorrow Times Seven =

1959 collection of science fiction stories by Frederik Pohl

First edition Cover by Richard M. Powers

Tomorrow Times Seven is a collection of science fiction stories by American writer Frederik Pohl, first published by Ballantine Books in July 1959.

== Contents ==
- "The Haunted Corpse" (Galaxy Science Fiction, January 1957)
- "The Middle of Nowhere" (Galaxy Science Fiction, May 1955)
- "The Gentle Venusian" (also known as "The Gentlest Unpeople", Galaxy Science Fiction June 1958)
- "The Day of the Boomer Dukes" (Future #30, 1956)
- "Survival Kit" (Galaxy Science Fiction, May 1957)
- "The Knights of Arthur" (Galaxy Science Fiction, January 1958)
- "To See Another Mountain" (The Magazine of Fantasy & Science Fiction, April 1959)
