= Drunkard's Walk (novel) =

1960 novel by Frederik Pohl

- Cover of the first edition.
- Author: Frederik Pohl
- Cover artist: Nik Puspurica
- Language: English
- Genre: Science fiction
- Publisher: Ballantine Books
- Publication date: November 28, 1960
- Publication place: United States
- Media type: Print (Paperback)
- Pages: 142

Drunkard's Walk is a science fiction novel by American writer Frederik Pohl. It was originally published in paperback by Ballantine Books in 1960 and early in 1961 by Gnome Press in a hardback edition of 3,000 copies. The novel was originally serialized in the magazine Galaxy Science Fiction.

== Plot ==
The novel tells the story of a math professor who struggles against urges to commit suicide. His life seemed so successful. He was a well-liked college-on-TV lecturer who offered the public a way to improve their meager living standards in the crowded future world of 2200. He has a lovely young wife, which would seem to be a protective factor. Doctors have ruled out depression, and they cannot figure out his problem. Yet in a suicidal attempt he tries to hurl himself from a high balcony. During one TV lecture he cuts his neck on live broadcast, and he takes an overdose of pills. In fact, a mysterious foe is trying to cause the professor to die, and this villain plans to increase the death toll into the millions.
