= Platinum Pohl =

2005 collection of thirty science fiction stories by Frederik Pohl

- First edition cover
- Author: Frederik Pohl
- Publisher: Tor Books
- Publication date: December 27, 2005
- ISBN: 0-312-87527-4

Platinum Pohl: The Collected Best Stories is a collection of thirty science fiction stories by Frederik Pohl, first published in December 2005 by Tor Books (ISBN 0-312-87527-4). It includes a volume introduction and story introductions by the editor, James Frenkel, plus an afterword by Pohl.

== Contents ==
- Introduction by James Frenkel
- "The Merchants of Venus", Worlds of If, July/August 1972.
- "The Things That Happen", Asimov's, October 1985
- "The High Test", Asimov's, June 1983.
- "My Lady Green Sleeves", Galaxy, February 1957.
- "The Kindly Isle", Asimov's, November 1984.
- "The Middle of Nowhere", Galaxy, May 1955.
- "I Remember a Winter", Orbit 11, Damon Knight (ed.), 1972.
- "The Greening of Bed-Stuy", F&SF, July 1984.
- "To See Another Mountain", F&SF, April 1959.
- "The Mapmakers", Galaxy, July 1955.
- "Spending a Day at the Lottery Fair", F&SF, October 1983.
- "The Celebrated No-Hit Inning", Fantastic Universe, September 1956.
- "Some Joys Under the Star", Galaxy, November 1973.
- "Servant of the People", Analog, February 1983.
- "Waiting for the Olympians", Asimov's, August 1988.
- "Criticality", Analog, December 1984.
- "Shaffery Among the Immortals", F&SF, July 1972.
- "The Day the Icicle Works Closed", Galaxy, February 1960.
- "Saucery", F&SF, October 1986.
- "The Gold at the Starbow's End", Analog, March 1972.
- "Growing Up in Edge City", Epoch, Roger Elwood and Robert Silverberg (eds.), 1975.
- "The Knights of Arthur", Galaxy, January 1958.
- "Creation Myths of the Recently Extinct", Analog, January 1994.
- "The Meeting" (in collaboration with C.M. Kornbluth), F&SF, November 1972.
- "Let the Ants Try", (as by James MacCreigh) Planet Stories, Winter 1949.
- "Speed Trap", Playboy, November 1967.
- "The Day the Martians Came", Dangerous Visions, Harlan Ellison (ed.), 1967.
- "Day Million", Rogue, February/March 1966.
- "The Mayor of Mare Tranq", The Williamson Effect, Tor, 1996.
- "Fermi and Frost", Asimov's, January 1985.
- Afterword : Fifty Years and Counting.
