= Turn Left at Thursday =

1961 collection of science fiction short stories by Frederik Pohl

Cover of the first edition. Art by Richard Powers.

Turn Left at Thursday (ISBN 0-345-21747-0) is a collection of science fiction short stories by American writer Frederik Pohl, published by Ballantine Books in 1961.

== Contents ==
- "Mars by Moonlight" (Galaxy Science Fiction, June 1958)
- "The Richest Man in Levittown" (also known as "The Bitterest Pill]"; Galaxy Science Fiction, April 1959)
- "The Seven Deadly Virtues" (as by Paul Flehr] - Galaxy Science Fiction August '58
- "The Martian in the Attic" - If July '60
- "Third Offense" (as by Charles Satterfield; Galaxy Science Fiction, August 1958)
- "The Hated" (as by Paul Flehr; Galaxy Science Fiction, January 1958)
- "I Plinglot, Who You?" (Galaxy Science Fiction, February 1959)
