= Stopping at Slowyear =

1991 novel by Frederik Pohl

- First edition
- Author: Frederik Pohl
- Cover artist: Rob Alexander
- Language: English
- Genre: Science fiction
- Publisher: Axolotl Press
- Publication date: 1992
- Publication place: United States
- Media type: Print (hardback & paperback)
- Pages: 150
- ISBN: 0-553-29487-3
- OCLC: 25808833

Stopping at Slowyear is a 1992 science fiction novel by American writer Frederik Pohl.

== Plot summary ==
Stopping at Slowyear tells the story of an interstellar cargo vessel which runs between out-of-the-way worlds, as it visits a planet called Slowyear after its 19-year-long revolution around its star.

The crew explore the local culture and find several odd customs. Among these is of a sort of death lottery as a punishment for crimes. If someone commits a crime, they are sentenced to take a pill, which depending on the severity of the infraction will have a different probability of being lethal poison.

Slowyear's principal industry is raising sheep. During their isolation, their sheep have developed a form of scrapie which is lethal to humans without immunity.

Stopping at Slowyear addressed prion diseases years before public awareness of mad cow disease was widespread.
