= The Abominable Earthman =

1963 collection of science fiction stories by Frederik Pohl

- First edition cover
- Author: Frederik Pohl
- Language: English
- Genre: Science fiction
- Publisher: Ballantine Books
- Publication date: 1963
- Publication place: United States
- ISBN: 0-345-21748-9

The Abominable Earthman is a collection of science fiction stories by American writer Frederik Pohl, first published by Ballantine Books in 1963.

== Contents ==
- "The Abominable Earthman" (from Galaxy, October 1961)
- "We Never Mention Aunt Nora" (as by Paul Flehr; Galaxy, July 1958)
- "A Life and a Half" (If, July 1959)
- "Punch" (Playboy, June 1961)
- "The Martian Star-Gazers" (Galaxy, February 1962)
- "Whatever Counts" (Galaxy, June 1959)
- "Three Portraits and a Prayer" (Galaxy, August 1962)
