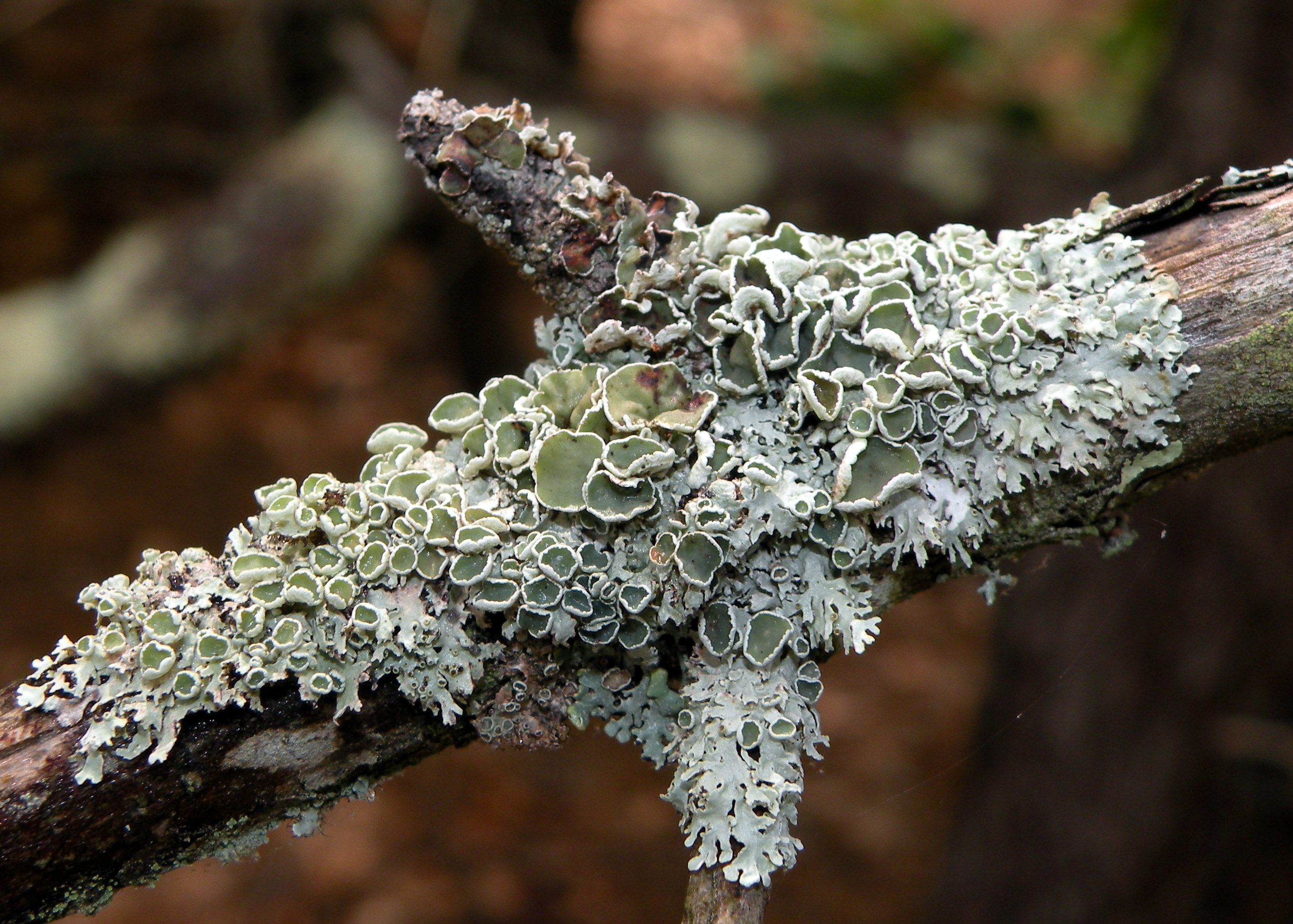

Conservation status
- Secure (NatureServe)

Scientific classification
- Kingdom: Fungi
- Division: Ascomycota
- Class: Lecanoromycetes
- Order: Lecanorales
- Family: Parmeliaceae
- Genus: Imshaugia
- Species: I. placorodia

Binomial name
- Imshaugia placorodia (Ach.) S.L.F.Mey. (1985)

Synonyms
- Parmelia placorodia Ach. (1814); Parmeliopsis placorodia (Ach.) Nyl. (1869)

= Imshaugia placorodia =

Species of lichen

Imshaugia placorodia, the American starburst lichen, is a species of corticolous (bark-dwelling), foliose lichen in the family Parmeliaceae.

== Taxonomy ==
The species was first formally described in 1814 by the Swedish lichenologist Erik Acharius, who classified it in the genus Parmelia, when that genus was much more broadly interpreted than it is now. He wrote the following about the species: "Parmelia placorodia has a circular, smooth thallus that is pale bluish-grey and smooth but wrinkled, with a milky appearance and dark greyish-black fissures. The lobes are folded, compact, scattered, and elevated, with a light brown color, and their margins are turned inward, wrinkled, and somewhat crenate (scalloped) and nearly closed. This lichen is found in North America on dead wood. It is distinguished by its distinct appearance, closely resembling Parmelia physodes var. platyphylla, and should not be confused with Parmelia conspersa". William Nylander transferred the taxon to the genus Parmeliopsis in 1869.

In 1985, Susan Meyer transferred it to the newly circumscribed genus Imshaugia, a segregate of genus Parmeliopsis distinguished by both microscopic and chemical characteristics. She designated as lectotype one of the specimens originally collected by Gotthilf Henry Ernest Muhlenberg, and kept at the Acharius Herbarium (H-ACH), at the Botanical Museum of the Finnish Museum of Natural History.

== Description ==
Imshaugia placorodia has a pale gray thallus comprising narrow lobes measuring 0.5–1.5 mm wide. Its apothecia (fruiting bodies) are 2–7 mm wide.

== Habitat and distribution ==
The North American distribution of Imshaugia placorodia includes eastern Canada and the northeastern United States, and areas of the central United States. In Mexico, it is found in the Northwest part of the country to its Central Volcanic Belt. It grows on the bark of various species of pine trees.
