= The Day After the Day the Martians Came =

- Short story by Frederik Pohl
- Language: English
- Genre: Science fiction

Publication
- Published in: Dangerous Visions
- Publication type: Anthology
- Publisher: Doubleday
- Media type: Print (hardcover)
- Publication date: 1967

"The Day After the Day the Martians Came" is a 1967 short story by American writer Frederik Pohl, first published in Harlan Ellison's anthology Dangerous Visions.

== Plot ==
The story takes place entirely within the lobby of a Florida hotel, one day after a NASA spacecraft carrying several live Martians lands at Cape Canaveral. Their assignments complete, a large group of journalists are loitering in the hotel's bar. Jaded and blasé, they pass the time until checkout by playing poker and telling tasteless ethnic jokes with Martians swapped in for their normal subjects, such as Poles. The hotel's small-minded manager views the discovery of the Martians with indifference, though he is delighted with the week's windfall profits. As the last of the reporters leaves, he turns to one of his black bellhops - whom he is accustomed to treat with condescension - and remarks that the Martians mean nothing to him. The bellhop gnomically replies: "they mean a great deal to me."

== Adaptations and Sequels ==
The story was adapted (under the same title) by Marvel Comics the SF anthology title Worlds Unknown (#1, May 1973), illustrated by Ralph Reese.

Pohl's published a follow-up, "Sad Solarian Screenwriter Sam," in the June 1972 issue of the Magazine of Fantasy and Science Fiction; it followed a day in the life of an ambitious Hollywood screenwriter, who is suddenly inspired to capitalize on the media hype surrounding the imminent arrival of the Martians by pitching a film adaptation of Edgar Rice Burroughs' Barsoom novels. The pitch is not received well, due to screenwriter not having taken a sufficient interest in the nature of the actual Martians (who are - as it turns out - only semi-sentient, and not very telegenic.)

After a nearly fifteen-year interval, Pohl revisited the setting with five new short stories, published in Asimov's, MF&SF, and Omni between 1986 and 1987:

- "A Martian Christmas" (originally published as "Adeste Fideles" in Omni, December 1987)
- "The View from Mars Hill" (Asimov's, May 1987)
- "Saucery" (The Magazine of Fantasy and Science Fiction, October 1986)
- "Too Much Loosestrife" (Amazing Stories, October 1987)
- "Iriadeska's Martians" (Asimov's, November 1986)

In 1988, the seven existing stories and three previously-unpublished ones ("The Missioner," "The Beltway Bandit," and "Across the River") were combined with nine interstitial vignettes into a fix-up novel, The Day the Martians Came.
