= Narabedla Ltd. =

1988 science fiction novel by Frederik Pohl

First edition (publ. Ballantine Books) Cover art by Barclay Shaw

Narabedla Ltd. is a science fiction novel by American writer Frederik Pohl, published by Ballantine Books in 1988. "Narabedla" is the name of the star Aldebaran written backwards.

== Plot summary ==
Narabedla Ltd. is a corporation that is owned by aliens and run by their human agents. The main character is an accountant who specializes in doing the tax returns of singers, dancers, and other performers. He had been majoring in singing himself, with a minor in accounting, when he comes down with an adult case of mumps. Mumps makes one's glands swell. It can ruin a singing voice by making the glands in the throat swell and it can make a man's testes swell, rendering him impotent.

The main character notices some of his clients disappearing. Their disappearances follow a similar pattern. They are talented, but bad reviews or other kinds of bad luck have prevented them achieving full success. They experience a period of no gigs. They confide in the main character that they have signed mysterious contracts for a long, lucrative tour of private gigs. Then they disappear. What his clients are not aware of is that their tour will be for aliens, on alien planets.

The main character does some amateur detective work. He begins to suspect that the President of the mysterious Narabedla corporation is involved. He gets knocked out and wakes up on an alien planet dozens of light years away from Earth. His imprisonment is quite pleasant. There is a small community of Earth artists, some of whom are perfectly happy spending the rest of their lives performing before appreciative alien audiences. The main character decides that he will try to escape.
