= The Siege of Eternity =

1997 science fiction novel by Frederik Pohl

- First edition (publ. Tor Books); Cover art by John Harris; With quote by David Brin
- Author: Frederik Pohl
- Language: English
- Publication date: 1997

The Siege of Eternity is a 1997 science fiction novel by American writer Frederik Pohl. It is the second novel in The Eschaton Sequence (it is the sequel to The Other End of Time, which was published in 1996). The Eschaton Sequence is about the adventures of Dan Dannerman, an American government agent of the near future who becomes involved with the discovery of advanced and warring aliens. In The Other End of Time, Dannerman is part of a group that is abducted by space aliens. In The Siege of Eternity, Dannerman and his cohort escape, only to find that they have been cloned and experimented on. Moreover, the aliens are battling for control of the powerful "Eschaton", a future which gives everyone eternal life.

== Plot ==
The novel is set in the near future, in a world in which the United States is struggling with many problems, including weapons of mass destruction, ecological damage, crime and hyperinflation. In The Other End of Time, government agent Dan Dannerman (actually a secret agent) goes up with a team to investigate an abandoned space station in Earth orbit after messages from space aliens are received. Dannerman and the group end up getting abducted by a type of space alien called "Beloved Leaders", who conduct many experiments on the humans, including making cloned copies and vivisection. In Siege of Eternity, Earth is caught in the crossfire in a war between aliens called the "Beloved Leaders" and the Horch, which control the "Eschaton", a future which gives eternal life. The abducted humans escape and return to Earth, where they learn that their clones are already there. The returning humans bring three captured aliens, who claim that they will teach humans about alien "Beloved Leader" technology. An officer from the National Bureau of Investigation takes control of the clones. Then the aliens warn that there will soon be an invasion by the Beloved Leaders, and perhaps an invasion of the Horch too. At the end of the novel, an undercover religious militant attempts to kill the abductees.

== Reception ==
Kirkus Reviews praises Pohl for doing a "...seamless job of reintroducing readers to the convolutions of his black-comic future tussle." However, the review states that "...while The Other End of Time was both self-contained and sequel-ready, this crowded, complex entry merely seems incomplete."
