= Starburst (novel) =

1982 novel by Frederick Pohl

Cover of the first edition, published by Del Rey Books. Art by David B. Mattingly.

Starburst is a science fiction novel by American writer Frederik Pohl, published in 1982. It is an expansion of his 1972 novella The Gold at the Starbow's End.

== Plot summary ==
Starbust is a novel in which an astronaut crew goes from being doomed to becoming superpowered.

== Reception ==
Dave Langford reviewed Starburst for White Dwarf #54, and stated that "OK at novelette length but Pohl just hinted at the details of their offstage apotheosis: but the more you hear about it the less likely it sounds, and the book becomes a prolonged anticlimax. A smooth read, yes, but the original story is diluted to insipidity."

== Reviews ==
- Review by Jeff Frane (1982) in Locus, #254 March 1982
- Review by Jim England (1982) in Vector 110
- Review by Algis Budrys (1982) in The Magazine of Fantasy & Science Fiction, November 1982
- Review by Tom Easton (1982) in Analog Science Fiction/Science Fact, December 1982
- Review by Baird Searles (1982) in Isaac Asimov's Science Fiction Magazine, Mid-December 1982
- Review by Doug Fratz (1984) in Thrust, #20, Summer 1984
