= The Space Merchants =

1953 novel by Frederik Pohl and C. M. Kornbluth

- Cover of first edition hardcover
- Author: Frederik Pohl and Cyril M. Kornbluth
- Cover artist: Richard M. Powers
- Language: English
- Series: Space Merchants
- Genre: Science Fiction/Satire
- Publisher: Ballantine Books
- Publication date: May 18, 1953
- Media type: Print (hardback & paperback)
- Pages: 179
- Followed by: The Merchants' War

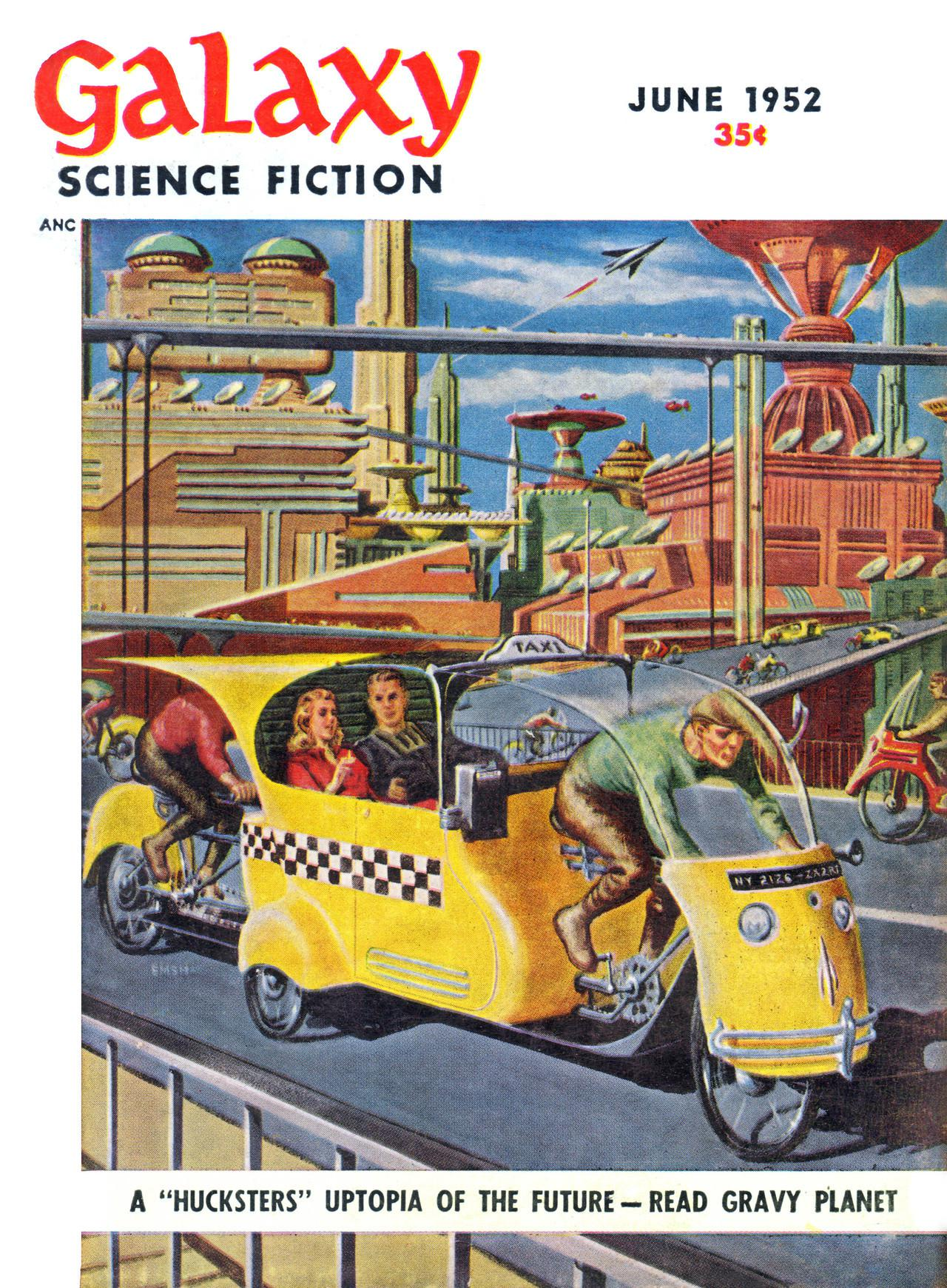
The first installment of Gravy Planet was cover-featured on the June 1952 issue of Galaxy Science Fiction.

The Space Merchants is a 1952 science fiction novel by American writers Frederik Pohl and Cyril M. Kornbluth. Originally published in Galaxy Science Fiction magazine as a serial entitled Gravy Planet, the novel was first published as a single volume in 1953, and has sold heavily since. It deals satirically with a hyper-developed consumerism, seen through the eyes of an advertising executive.

In 1984, Pohl published a sequel, The Merchants' War. In 2012, it was included in the Library of America omnibus American Science Fiction: Four Classic Novels 1953–1956. Pohl revised the original novel in 2011 with added material and more contemporary references.

== Plot ==
In a vastly overpopulated world, businesses have taken the place of governments and now hold political power. States exist merely to ensure the survival of huge trans-national corporations. Advertising has become aggressive and by far the best-paid profession. Through advertising, the public is falsely led into thinking that the quality of life is improved by all the products placed on the market. Some of the products contain addictive substances designed to make consumers dependent on them. However, the most basic elements of life are incredibly scarce, including water and fuel. Personal transport is largely manually powered, with rickshaw rides being considered a luxury. The planet Venus has just been visited and judged fit for human settlement, despite its inhospitable surface and climate; the colonists would have to endure a harsh climate for many generations until the planet could be terraformed.

The protagonist, Mitch Courtenay, is a star-class copywriter in the Fowler Schocken advertising agency who has been assigned the ad campaign which would attract colonists to Venus. But a lot more is happening than he knows about. It soon becomes a tale of mystery and intrigue, in which many of the characters are not what they seem, and Mitch's loyalties and opinions change drastically over the course of the narrative. One of the hazards he faces is a psychopathic agent of his former company, found using the same psychological techniques used to identify targets for advertising.

Mitch goes to a resort in Antarctica, only to become lost outside in a blizzard. He recovers to find that he has been shanghaied as an ordinary working stiff. His ID number tattooed on his arm has been altered so he cannot reclaim his old identity. However, his skills remain intact. He becomes the propaganda specialist for a cadre of revolutionaries (the World Conservationist Association, known as Consies), in the process becoming a convert to the cause of those he once manipulated as mere consumers. In the end he confronts those who stole his life, who are not necessarily his enemies, and those from his old life, who are not necessarily his friends.

== Publication and reception ==
=== Origins ===
Whilst serving in the US Army Air Force during the Second World War, Pohl had been posted to Stornara, in south-eastern Italy, as a weather forecaster. Shortly after learning of his mother's death in 1944, and feeling somewhat homesick, he decided to start writing a novel about New York. He chose to write about the advertising industry, thinking it to be the most interesting topic in the city, and patiently wrote "a long, complicated, and very bad novel" with the title of For Some We Loved.

After the war ended, in early 1946, he re-read the manuscript, and decided that its major flaw was that he had written it despite knowing nothing about advertising. Before rewriting it, he applied for advertising jobs to gain some background, and on 1 April 1946 joined a small Madison Avenue agency as their chief copywriter. He later moved to Popular Science, finding that he enjoyed the work so much he lost track of why he originally took the job.

Some years later, Pohl returned to For Some We Loved. In early 1950, he read through the original manuscript, but found the writing to be completely unsalvageable; he burned it, and decided to forget the idea. The following year, he began drafting a science fiction novel, loosely themed on advertising, under the name of Fall Campaign, and had reached twenty thousand words by the summer, working at weekends and in the evenings. At this point, Pohl's old friend Cyril Kornbluth arrived, having quit his job in Chicago to freelance as a science fiction writer, and offered to look over the manuscript. A short while later he returned, having incorporated some plot suggestions made by Philip Klass and written a new twenty-thousand word middle section; the two men collaborated on the final third, and after Pohl gave it a final revision, the novel was complete.

=== Publication ===
Horace Gold, the editor of Galaxy Science Fiction, had read the draft before Kornbluth had become involved, and offered to print it when it was complete, tentatively scheduled to follow Alfred Bester's The Demolished Man. In the event, it was serialised in the magazine from June to August 1952, as Gravy Planet.

However, finding a publisher for the novel itself was not easy. Pohl offered it to every American publishing house which printed science fiction, without any success. Eventually, he met Ian Ballantine, an old colleague of his wife's, who had just founded Ballantine Books and was looking for new titles. Ballantine agreed to publish it—Pohl joked that "he was just too inexperienced to know that it was no good"—and it was released in May 1953 in simultaneous paperback and hardcover editions. The book edition dropped the previously published concluding chapters, reportedly added for the magazine version at the request of Galaxy editor H.L. Gold.

Twenty-five years after first publication, writing in The Way The Future Was, Pohl estimated that it had sold perhaps ten million copies in twenty-five languages. Pohl's 2011 light revision of the novel includes references to some commercial phenomena in the Reagan–Bush era, including Enron and AIG.

In 2012, it was included in the Library of America omnibus American Science Fiction: Four Classic Novels 1953–1956, edited by Gary K. Wolfe. The omnibus was part of a two-volume set of 1950s science fiction, the first LOA project to include an extensive online companion site.

=== Critical reception ===
In his study of the pioneers of science fiction, New Maps of Hell (1960), the novelist Kingsley Amis states that The Space Merchants "has many claims to being the best science-fiction novel so far." It is also ahead of its time in stressing the importance of limiting population growth and conserving natural resources. On its initial publication, Groff Conklin called the novel "perhaps the best science fiction satire since Brave New World." Boucher and McComas praised it as "bitter, satiric, exciting [and] easily one of the major works of logical extrapolation in several years.... a sharp melodrama of power-conflict and revolt which manages... to explore all the implied developments of [its imagined] society." Imagination reviewer Mark Reinsberg described it as "a marvellously entertaining story" and "A brilliant future satire." P. Schuyler Miller compared the novel to Brave New World, finding it "not so brilliant, but more consistently worked out and suffering principally... from its concessions to melodrama." At the 1976 MidAmeriCon convention in Kansas City, Alfred Bester referred to the novel as "one of the top two science fiction novels of all time." It was rated the 24th "all-time best novel" in a 1975 Locus poll, jointly with The Martian Chronicles and The War of the Worlds. The novel was also included in David Pringle's list of 100 best science fiction novels.

As with many significant works of science fiction, it was lexically inventive. The novel is cited by the Oxford English Dictionary as the first recorded source for several new words, including "soyaburger", "moon suit", "tri-di" for "three-dimensional", "R and D" for "research and development", "sucker-trap" for a shop aimed at gullible tourists, and one of the first uses of "muzak" as a generic term. It is also cited as the first incidence of "survey" as a verb meaning to carry out a poll.

The Space Merchants has also been praised for its investigation of themes relating to 'prosumption', and the impact of overconsumption. Critic Mike Ryder (2022) argued that one of the most significant themes is the ‘robotization’ of producers and consumers, such that the very nature of humanity itself comes into question.

=== Adaptations ===
The film rights were sold for $50,000, though an adaptation was never made. It was adapted for radio by the CBS Radio Workshop.

== Sources ==
- Pohl, Frederik (1982). The Way The Future Was : a memoir. Granada. ISBN 0-586-05211-9.
- Amis, Kingsley (1960). New Maps of Hell : a survey of science fiction. Harcourt, Brace.
