= Alternating Currents (short story collection) =

1956 collection of short stories by Frederik Pohl

- First edition Cover art by Richard M. Powers
- Author: Frederik Pohl
- Genre: Science fiction short stories
- Publisher: Ballantine Books
- Publication date: January 1, 1956

Alternating Currents is a collection of science fiction stories by American writer Frederik Pohl, first published by Ballantine Books in 1956.

== Contents ==
- "Happy Birthday, Dear Jesus" (from Alternating Currents, 1956)
- "The Ghost Maker" (Beyond Fantasy Fiction January 1954)
- "Let the Ants Try" (Planet Stories, 1949)
- "Pythias" (Galaxy Science Fiction, February 1955)
- "The Mapmakers" (Galaxy Science Fiction, July 1955)
- "Rafferty’s Reasons" (Fantastic Universe, October 1955)
- "Target One" (Galaxy Science Fiction, April 1955)
- "Grandy Devil" (Galaxy Science Fiction, June 1955)
- "The Tunnel under the World" (Galaxy Science Fiction, January 1955)
- "What to Do Until the Analyst Comes (Everybody’s Happy But Me!)" (Imagination, February 1956, as "What to Do Till the Analyst Comes")

"The Children of Night" (originally published in Galaxy Science Fiction of October 1964) replaces "Happy Birthday, Dear Jesus" in UK editions. Penguin Books, (ISBN 0-14-002452-2)

== Reception ==
Anthony Boucher found the stories to be "largely slight and hasty in view of Pohl's best work . . . [but] still reveal much wit and imagination."
