= The Merchants' War (Pohl novel) =

1984 novel by Frederik Pohl

- First edition
- Author: Frederik Pohl
- Cover artist: Izumi Inoue
- Language: English
- Series: Space Merchants
- Genre: Science fiction
- Publisher: St. Martin’s Press
- Publication date: 1984
- Publication place: United States
- Media type: Print
- Pages: 336
- ISBN: 978-0-312-53010-5
- OCLC: 11262127
- Dewey Decimal: 813/.54 19
- LC Class: PS3566.O36 M47 1984
- Preceded by: The Space Merchants

The Merchants' War is a 1984 satirical science fiction novel by American writer Frederik Pohl. Set in a near future commercial dystopian interplanetary society, the novel was a sequel to The Space Merchants, and was originally co-published with it as Venus, Inc. Pohl's collaborator in the first novel, C.M. Kornbluth, died in 1958, and so did not contribute to this sequel.

In the story, the colony on Venus has managed to stabilize itself to a point. However, agents from the trans-national corporations on Earth attempt to undermine the stability of the colony. The story follows the trail of two advertisement company employees from the colony back to Earth, as one of them, Tennison Tarb, struggles with addiction and its effect on his advertising career. Eventually, he uncovers a 'Veenie' plot to take over Earth and has to choose sides. As with the preceding book, the characters are not what they seem, and the main character's loyalty changes drastically.

== Reception ==
Dave Langford reviewed The Merchants' War for White Dwarf #70, and stated that "The original 'comic inferno' ended with the hero's escape to Venus: the hero of The Merchant's War stays on Earth and reforms it, with a priggishness which wrecks the satire. It's easy reading, but a completely unnecessary book."

== Reviews ==
- Review by Richard D. Erlich (1985) in Fantasy Review, March 1985
- Review [French] by Michel Cossement (1985) in SFère, #21
- Review by Tom A. Jones (1985) in Vector 128
- Review [French] by Richard D. Nolane (1985) in Fiction, #367
- Review by Kenny Mathieson (1985) in Foundation, #35 Winter 1985/1986, (1986)
- Review by Ken Lake (1987) in Paperback Inferno, #65
- Review [Serbian] by Miodrag Milovanović? (1987) in Alef, #1
- Review [French] by Bertrand Bonnet (2008) in Bifrost, #52
