= Midas World =

1983 collection of science fiction short stories by Frederik Pohl

- Author: Frederik Pohl
- Language: English
- Genre: Science fiction
- Publisher: St. Martin's Press
- Publication date: 1983
- ISBN: 0312531826
- OCLC: 230385482

Midas World is a collection of science fiction short stories by American writer Frederik Pohl, published in 1983.

== Stories ==
- "The Fire Bringer" (first published in this collection). This introductory story deals with a man named Amalfi Amadeus who develops nuclear fusion by trapping plasma in a cup of monopoles, bringing cheap energy to the world. His invention is snapped up by corporate America, but he is soon forgotten.
- "The Midas Plague" (originally published in Galaxy in 1954). In a world of cheap energy, robots are overproducing the commodities enjoyed by humankind. The lower-class "poor" must spend their lives in frantic consumption, trying to keep up with the robots' extravagant production, while the upper-class "rich" can live lives of simplicity. Property crime is nonexistent, and the government Ration Board enforces the use of ration stamps to ensure that everyone consumes their quotas. The story deals with Morey Fry, who marries a woman from a higher-class family. Raised in a home with only five rooms she is unused to a life of forced consumption in their mansion of 26 rooms, nine automobiles, and five robots, causing arguments. Trained as an engineer, Morey modifies his robots to enjoy helping to consume his family's quota. He fears punishment when his idea is discovered, but the Ration Board—which has been looking for a way to abolish itself—quickly implements Morey's idea across the world.
- "The Servant of the People" (originally published in Analog in 1982). This story deals with incumbent Congressman Fiorello O'Hare, the original crusader for robot rights. His challenger, Mayor Thom, is a robot and seems to be faring better than his previous opponents ever have. He is carrying a large portion of the robot vote and it is discovered that the robots are choosing him over the congressman because the congressman has health issues and they feel he deserves a rest. But the congressman's wife changes their minds when she reveals that it would be psychologically damaging for the congressman to lose.
- "The Man Who Ate the World" (originally published in Galaxy in 1956). Anderson Trumie had a scarring experience in his childhood, before Morey Fry changed the world. All Anderson wanted was a teddy bear, but his parents' lifestyle of frantic consumption did not allow him to have one. As an adult, he is a compulsive consumer. He has taken over North Guardian Island and is putting a burden on the local infrastructure. A psychist, Roger Garrick, with the help of Kathryn Pender, finds a way to heal Anderson and end his exorbitant consumption.
- "The Farmer on the Dole" (originally published in Omni in 1982). A robot, Zeb, has spent the first part of his life as a soybean farmer, but his owner falls on hard times and sells the farm, forcing his robots to move on. Zeb is sent to Chicago, where he is given a new job as a mugger. At this point most human beings have left the planet and only a few remain on Earth. The robots are employed to keep society appearing the same as it was before humanity escaped into space. On two occasions Zeb violates protocol and mugs a human being. Forced to run from the law, he eventually falls in with other robot malcontents and finds himself at the head of a burgeoning robot liberation march.
- "The Lord of the Skies" (originally published in Amazing Science Fiction Stories in 1983). Earth has been ravaged by the heat produced by nuclear fusion and most human beings now live in Earth orbit. Michael Pellica-Perkins lives a life of luxury. While hunting a "Noyman" (a Von Neumann probe that collects raw materials such as iron or tritium in the Solar System and brings them back to Earth), Michael has an accident and is picked up by a shuttle going down to Earth. On Earth he is met by his brother, Rodney, who reveals that he and Michael's ex-wife, Ann, are planning to destroy the orbiting space stations that transmit the energy that Earth produces out to the orbiting habitats. After one of Rodney's robots, Gideon, shows him a presentation Rodney has prepared, Michael agrees to help Rodney and Ann. But once in space, he pulls a coup and sends them on an interstellar flight, forever eliminating the risk they posed.
- "The New Neighbors" (originally published in The Magazine of Fantasy & Science Fiction in 1983). Toxic air has made Chicago uninhabitable for humans. The city is inhabited entirely by robots, who no longer refrain from activities that humans might find unpleasant, such as turning the volume of their radios up to earsplitting levels, or leaving garbage out for weeks before collection (since they can turn their sense of smell off at will). A human couple moves into an apartment block and befriends Ralph, a robot with a dog named Cissie. The humans are disturbed by the habits of the other robots in the apartment block, and the robots are irritated by the humans' petty complaints. Ralph, an archaeologist, finds previously undiscovered notes by Amalfi Amadeus that reveal his loss of faith in humanity. Ralph joins the other robots in the apartment block in evicting the new humans.

The story "The Midas Plague" was adapted into a teleplay for the first series of Out of the Unknown, and was anthologized in The Science Fiction Hall of Fame, Volume Two.
