= The Merchants of Venus =

1972 science fiction novella by Frederik Pohl

"The Merchants of Venus" is a science fiction novella by American writer Frederik Pohl and published in 1972 as part of the collection The Gold at the Starbow's End.

It is a satire of runaway free market capitalism. It also features the first appearance of the Heechee.

== Plot ==
The story is about Audee Walthers, an "airbody driver and tour operator", who scams Earth tourists who visit Venus. He needs a new liver, so he is seeking a rich client to profit from. He is pleased to meet the seemingly well-off Boyce Cochenour, but Walthers finds out that Cochenour also needs money.

== Publication ==
=== Novella ===
In 1972 by Ballantine Books included the novella in the anthology, The Gold at the Starbow's End.

=== Adaptation ===
The story was adapted as a graphic novel by Victoria Petersen and Neal McPheeters in 1986, as the fourth title in the DC Science Fiction Graphic Novel series.

== Nomenclature ==
Though user-curated databases claim the work was also known as The Merchants of Venus Underground, authoritative databases do not list it by that name.
