= Stars in fiction =

Simulated view travelling through a field of stars

Stars outside of the Solar System have been featured as settings in works of fiction since at least the 1600s, though this did not become commonplace until the pulp era of science fiction. Stars themselves are rarely a point of focus in fiction, their most common role being an indirect one as hosts of planetary systems. In stories where stars nevertheless do get specific attention, they play a variety of roles. Their appearance as points of light in the sky is significant in several stories where there are too many, too few, or an unexpected arrangement of them; in fantasy, they often serve as omens. Stars also appear as sources of power, be it the heat and light of their emanating radiation or superpowers. Certain stages of stellar evolution have received particular attention: supernovae, neutron stars, and black holes. Stars being depicted as sentient beings—whether portrayed as supernatural entities, personified in human form, or simply anthropomorphized as having intelligence—is a recurring theme. Real stars occasionally make appearances in science fiction, especially the nearest: the Alpha Centauri system, often portrayed as the destination of the first interstellar voyage. Tau Ceti, a relatively-nearby star regarded as a plausible candidate for harbouring habitable planets, is also popular.

== Early depictions ==
Among the earliest depictions of stars as locations that can be visited is Bernard Le Bovier de Fontenelle's 1686 work Entretiens sur la pluralité des mondes (Conversations on the Plurality of Worlds). The centuries that followed saw further such portrayals in Emanuel Swedenborg's 1758 work De Telluribus in Mundo Nostro Solari (Concerning the Earths in Our Solar System), C. I. Defontenay's 1854 novel Star ou Psi de Cassiopée (Star: Psi Cassiopeia), and Camille Flammarion's 1887 novel Lumen, but they remained rare throughout this time period. The early 1900s saw a few further interstellar voyages with Robert William Cole's 1900 novel The Struggle for Empire: A Story of the Year 2236, Jean Delaire's 1904 novel Around a Distant Star, and William Shuler Harris's 1905 novel Life in a Thousand Worlds before the concept became popular in the pulp era of science fiction.

== As objects in the sky ==
Stars, and their positions in the night sky as seen from Earth, have long been regarded as holding a particular significance to humans. Constellations have been integrated into various mythologies, and the pseudoscience of astrology posits that the positions of the stars can be used to predict the future. Astrology very rarely features in science fiction (other than as a subject of satire), Piers Anthony's 1969 novel Macroscope being one of the few exceptions. Observations of stars as literal objects, points of light in the sky, nevertheless play important roles in several stories. In Isaac Asimov's 1941 short story "Nightfall", the first sight of a star-filled night sky, from a planet that is otherwise in daylight from at least one of its many suns for millennia at a time, drives people to madness. The opposite occurrence, of the stars disappearing from view, appears in Arthur C. Clarke's 1953 short story "The Nine Billion Names of God" and heralds the end of the universe. Poul Anderson's 1967 short story "Starfog" is set on a planet in a star cluster so dense that the night sky is entirely filled with stars, while his 1966 novel World Without Stars (a.k.a. The Ancient Gods) is set on a world so remote the night sky is virtually devoid of stars. Unfamiliar arrangements of stars in the sky are sometimes used to establish that the action does not take place on Earth. In fantasy, stars mainly serve as omens—though many such "stars" are in fact planets.

== Properties ==
Stars, although there is a certain poetical reference to them in much science fiction, do not actually feature in much depth in most SF stories. There are a couple of notable exceptions. [...] However, in the main, the stars themselves remain relatively untouched in the pages of SF, and exist simply as a means of providing light and warmth to planets they we may wish to visit or colonize.

— George Mann, The Mammoth Encyclopedia of Science Fiction, "Stars" entry

For the most part, stars in fiction vary only in size and colour. Exceptions to this are rare and appear comparatively lately in the history of science fiction. A toroidal star is depicted in Donald Malcolm's 1964 short story "Beyond the Reach of Storms", while stars in the shape of two interlinked toruses appear in Terry Pratchett's 1976 novel The Dark Side of the Sun as the result of large-scale engineering by a cryptic race of advanced aliens.

=== Planets ===
The main function stars serve in fiction is as hosts of planetary systems. Unusual stellar properties are sometimes explored through the effect they have on the orbiting planets, though this is comparatively rare. In Hal Clement's 1946 short story "Cold Front", a planet's meteorological conditions are determined not just by the properties of its own atmosphere, but also variations in the star's atmosphere. In Vernor Vinge's 1999 novel A Deepness in the Sky, a variable star leaves the inhabitants of one of its planets in lengthy periods of hibernation during its phases of decreased output. The effect existing in a multiple star system might have on planets, on the other hand, has received significant attention in fiction.

=== Power sources ===
Diagram of a Dyson sphere the size of Earth's orbit around the Sun

Another role stars play in fiction is as sources of power. One concept for maximizing this potential is enclosing the entire star in a Dyson sphere, thus making it possible to harness all of its energy output (Note: Corresponding to a Type II civilization on the Kardashev scale.) rather than just the fraction emitted in a particular direction. Such objects were first formally proposed by Freeman Dyson in 1960 (Note: Dyson drew inspiration from a brief passage in Olaf Stapledon's 1937 novel Star Maker—"every solar system [...] surrounded by a gauze of light traps, which focused the escaping solar energy for intelligent use"—and suggested that "Stapledon sphere" would be a more apt term.) and have since been depicted in works of fiction such as Bob Shaw's 1975 novel Orbitsville. Variations on the concept also appear, for instance a half-sphere of the same kind as in Larry Niven and Gregory Benford's 2012 novel Bowl of Heaven, where the open half allows the star to be used for propulsion through space via a so-called Shkadov thruster. Other works envision the creation of artificial stars to provide energy. In Arthur C. Clarke's 1951 novel The Sands of Mars, the Martian moon Phobos is turned into a star in an effort to terraform Mars, while Clarke's 1982 novel 2010: Odyssey Two conversely depicts the planet Jupiter being turned into a star for the benefit of its moon Europa. In comic books, the source of Superman's superpowers is the light from a yellow star like the Sun.

== Stellar evolution ==
Advances in astronomy in the 1900s led to the development of theories of stellar evolution. This provided an explanation for the appearance of new stars in the sky, which had been observed for centuries. These "novae" or "supernovae" (Note: Initially, all new stars were called "novae". The classification of these events was refined in 1934 to distinguish between two different types: a less powerful one that retained the name novae, and a much more powerful type that became known as supernovae. The terms are nevertheless often used interchangeably by fiction writers.) are caused by stars exploding, a concept that appeared in fiction throughout the century. The new understanding of stellar lifecycles also predicted entirely new types of objects: collapsed stars known as neutron stars and black holes, which became popular in science fiction during the second half of the century.

=== Supernovae ===
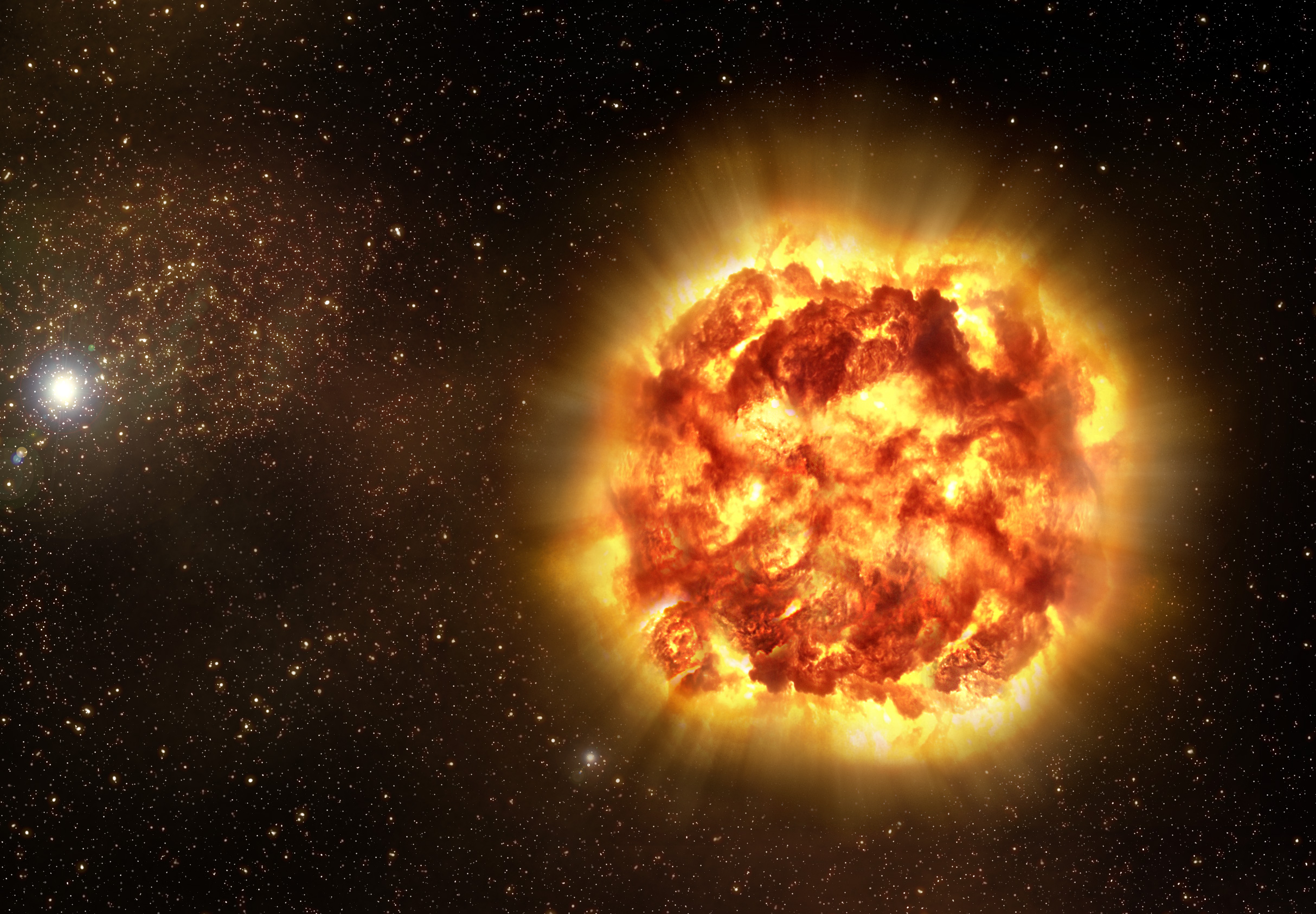
Artist's impression of a supernova

Supernovae are extremely powerful explosions that some types of stars undergo at the end of their lifecycles. The notion that the Sun might explode in this manner serves as the basis for numerous disaster stories, though it is now recognized that this cannot actually happen as the necessary stellar conditions are not met. (Note: Most types of supernovae result from the core of a star far more massive than the Sun undergoing gravitational collapse, and the remaining type Ia supernovae—as well as the less energetic novae—result from matter accreting onto a white dwarf from a binary companion.) Earth is nevertheless threatened by the radiation from more distant supernovae in several works; for instance, Roger MacBride Allen and Eric Kotani's 1991 novel Supernova revolves around the calamitous impact of a supernova in the Sirius system on Earth, while Charles Sheffield's 1998 novel Aftermath portrays a supernova in the Alpha Centauri system disrupting modern electronics on Earth through its electromagnetic pulse. Besides humans, alien civilizations are also subject to the dangers of supernovae in some stories. In Arthur C. Clarke's 1955 short story "The Star", an alien species is found to have gone extinct some two millennia ago when their star exploded, creating the biblical Star of Bethlehem. In Poul Anderson's 1967 short story "Day of Burning" (a.k.a. "Supernova"), humans try to evacuate a planet inhabited by a pre-spacefaring society threatened by a supernova.

=== Neutron stars ===
Stars that have undergone supernova events can leave behind extremely dense remnants known as neutron stars. These objects are characterized by very strong gravitational fields yet comparatively small sizes on the order of a few kilometers or miles, resulting in extreme tidal forces in their proximity. In Larry Niven's 1966 short story "Neutron Star", a spacefarer is thus imperiled when the spacecraft approaches such a star too closely and the difference in gravitational pull between the near and far end threatens to rip it apart. In Gregory Benford's 1978 novel The Stars in Shroud, a neutron star is used for gravity assist maneuvers. Neutron stars are depicted as harbouring life on the surface and interior, respectively, in Robert L. Forward's 1980 novel Dragon's Egg and Stephen Baxter's 1993 novel Flux. Neutron star mergers release enormous amounts of radiation that could cause extinction events at interstellar distances; such an event devastates Earth in Greg Egan's 1997 novel Diaspora, and the anticipation thereof is portrayed in Baxter's 2000 novel Manifold: Space and the 2005–2006 television series Threshold.

=== Black holes ===
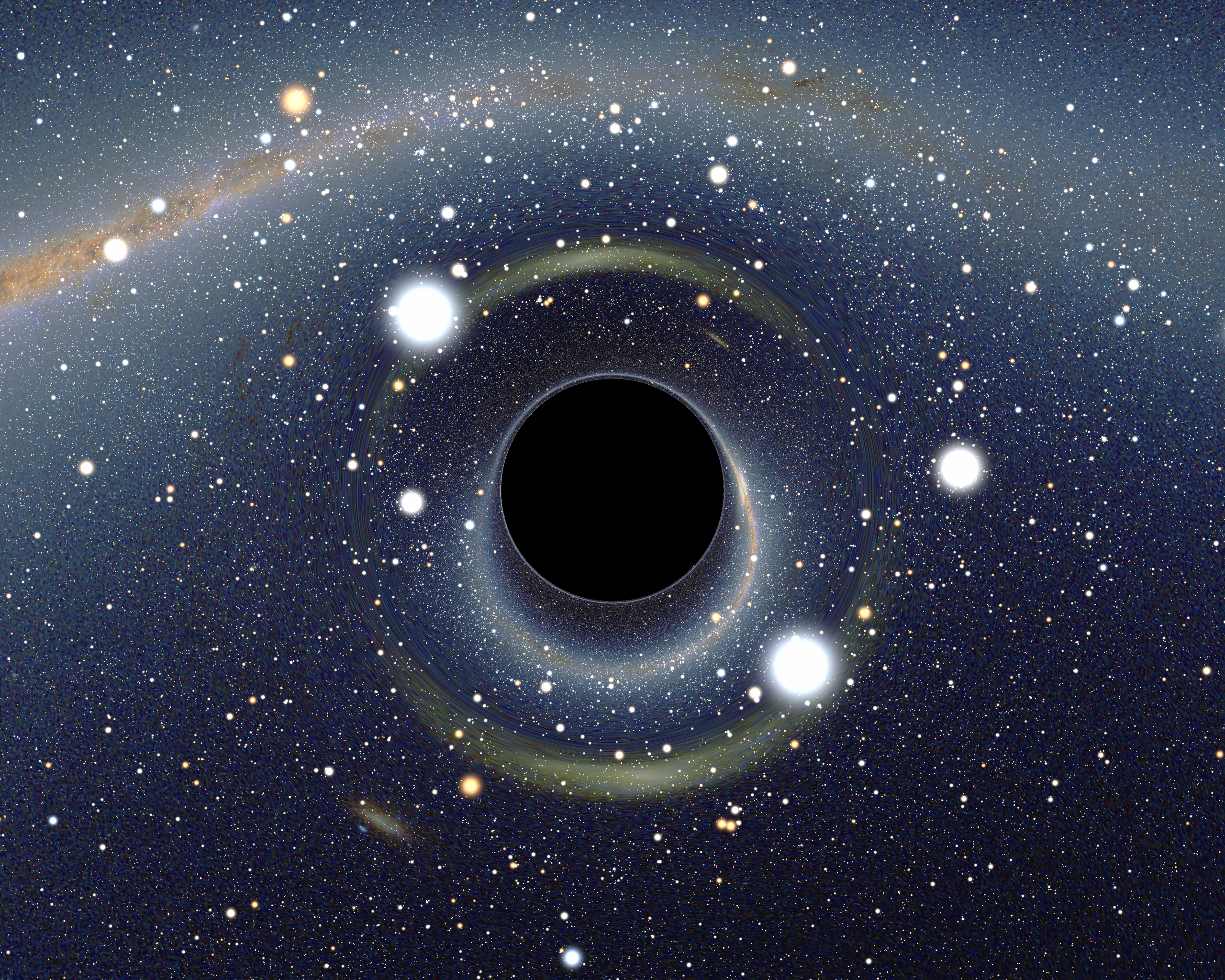
Simulated view of a black hole in front of the Large Magellanic Cloud, with gravitational lensing visible

A dying star with mass sufficiently greater than needed to produce a neutron star becomes an even more dense object: a black hole. These objects are defined by having gravity so strong that nothing—including light—can escape from them. The principal mechanism of black hole formation is the gravitational collapse of a massive star, but this is not the only theoretically possible mechanism. (Note: See e.g. Primordial black hole and Direct collapse black hole.) Black holes that form as a result of other processes need not be stellar-mass, but can range from microscopic to supermassive. One role black holes play in fiction is as hazards to spacefarers—in modern science fiction, largely to the exclusion of regular stars serving that function. Another common motif is the use of black holes to traverse vast distances through space quickly, often by serving as the entrance to a wormhole; (Note: The special mathematically predicted properties of rotating black holes suggest that travellers entering them need not encounter and be destroyed by the singularity inside; astrophysicists Steven D. Bloom and Andrew May argue that the strong tidal forces would nevertheless invariably be fatal, May pointing specifically to spaghettification.) examples include Joe Haldeman's 1974 fix-up novel The Forever War and Joan D. Vinge's 1980 novel The Snow Queen. More exotically, the point of emergence is occasionally portrayed as another point in time—thus enabling time travel—or even an entirely different universe. The gravitational time dilation caused by black holes is also sometimes used as a plot device.

== Sentient ==
Stars as sentient beings, in one form or another, is a recurring theme. Anthropomorphized, thinking stars appear in Olaf Stapledon's 1937 novel Star Maker and Frederik Pohl and Jack Williamson's Starchild trilogy consisting of the 1964 novel The Reefs of Space, the 1965 novel Starchild, and the 1969 novel Rogue Star. The conception of stars as divine or otherwise supernatural entities is a common element, appearing for instance in Gregory Benford and Gordon Eklund's 1977 novel If the Stars are Gods. Personified stars in human form appear in C. S. Lewis's 1952 novel The Voyage of the Dawn Treader and Madeleine L'Engle's 1962 novel A Wrinkle in Time, while Diana Wynne Jones's 1975 children's novel Dogsbody depicts the sentient star Sirius confined to the body of a dog. In James White's 1997 novel Final Diagnosis, a virus infects stars and turns them sentient. A small number of stories feature the related concept of lifeforms existing inside stars, as in Hal Clement's 1942 short story "Proof".

== Real stars ==
Real stars make occasional appearances in science fiction, sometimes with planetary systems. A 2024 article in the Journal of Science Communication analysed a sample of 142 fictional exoplanets, nearly a third of which were described as orbiting real stars, and found "an absence of influence of whether or not the planet setting is in a real star system on other worldbuilding characteristics".

The Alpha Centauri system is the closest star system to Earth—with Proxima Centauri being the closest of the system's stars—which has given it a special position in science fiction literature. Several stories of the first interstellar journeys have featured it as the intended destination. Among the earliest examples are the 1931 short story "Across the Void" by Leslie F. Stone and the 1935 short story "Proxima Centauri" by Murray Leinster. The spacecraft in the latter reaches its destination in less than a decade but has the capacity to function as a generation starship if needed; the use of an actual generation starship headed for the system was later depicted in the 1944 novel Far Centaurus by A. E. van Vogt, and the 1997 novel Alpha Centauri by William Barton and Michael Capobianco portrays such a mission being endangered by terrorists. Conversely, Liu Cixin's 2006 novel The Three-Body Problem depicts aliens from Alpha Centauri coming to Earth.

The Tau Ceti system is a common setting in science fiction. James Nicoll, writing for Tor.com, attributes this to a confluence of factors that make it the nearest star (at a distance of approximately 12 light-years) that could plausibly harbour habitable planets, including having a favourable brightness and being a solitary rather than multiple star. In 2015, Andrew Liptak interviewed several authors about why they used Tau Ceti for their stories; in addition to the star's relative proximity to Earth, Ursula K. Le Guin (who wrote The Dispossessed, 1974) and Larry Niven (The Legacy of Heorot, 1987, with Jerry Pournelle and Steven Barnes) cited the star's similarity to the Sun, while Kim Stanley Robinson (Aurora, 2015) pointed to the recent discovery of several exoplanets around Tau Ceti.

== See also ==
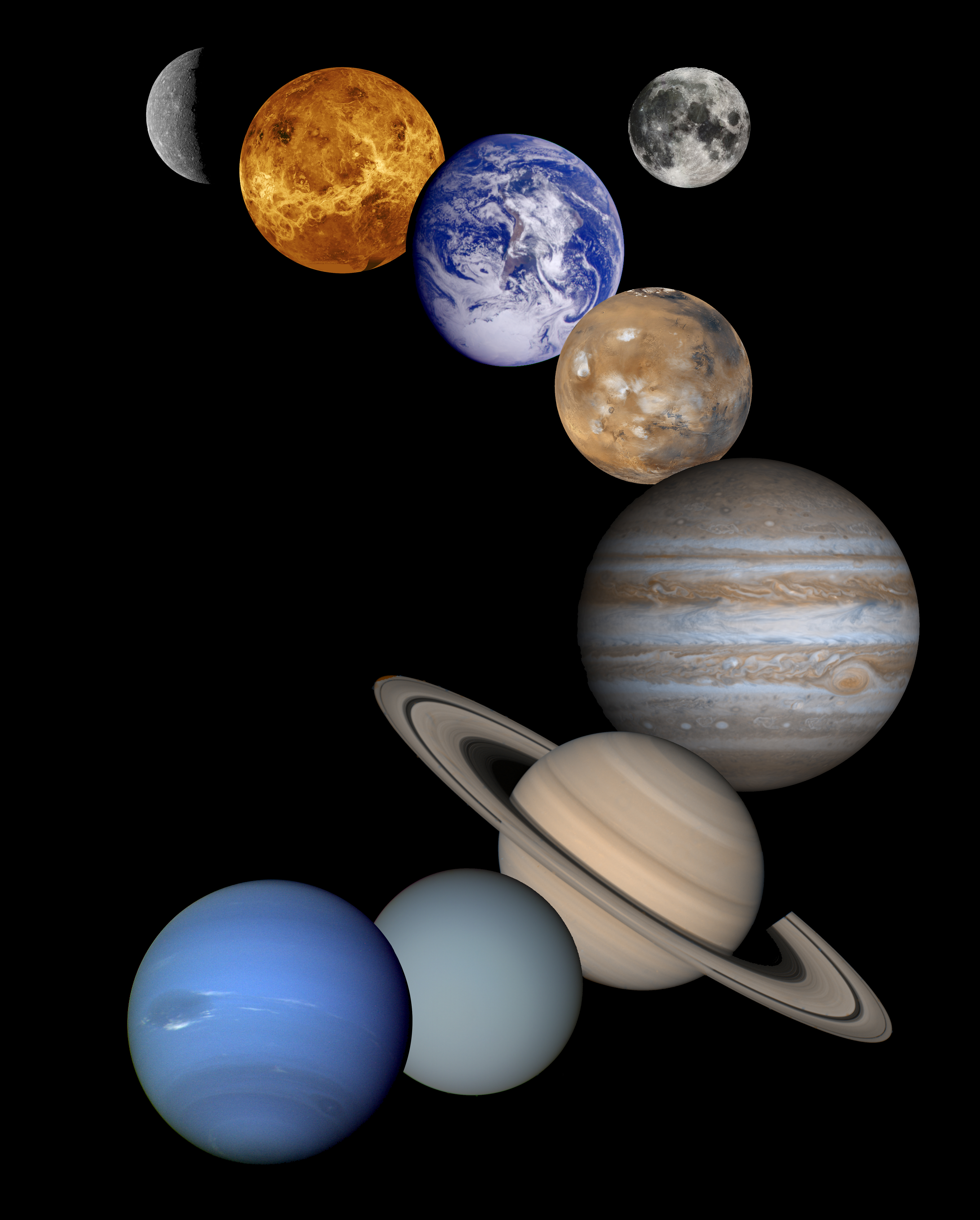
Clicking on a planet leads to the article about its depiction in fiction.

- Sun in fiction
