= Tractor beam =

Proposed technological device

A tractor beam is a device that can attract one object to another from a distance. The concept originates in fiction: The term was coined by E. E. Smith (an update of his earlier "attractor beam") in his novel Spacehounds of IPC (1931). Since the 1990s, technology and research have labored to make it a reality, and have had some success on a microscopic level. Less commonly, a similar beam that repels is known as a pressor beam or repulsor beam. Gravity impulse and gravity propulsion beams are traditionally areas of research from fringe physics that coincide with the concepts of tractor and repulsor beams; tractor beams developed by mainstream researchers and engineers are generally not based on gravity, and practical designs typically use electromagnetism and/or motion of a medium.

== Physics ==
Water tractor beam

A force field confined to a collimated beam with clean borders is one of the principal characteristics of tractor and repulsor beams. Several theories have predicted that repulsive effects do not fall within the category of tractor and repulsor beams because of the absence of field collimation. For example, Robert L. Forward of Hughes Research Laboratories showed that general relativity theory allowed the generation of a very brief impulse of a gravity-like repulsive force along the axis of a helical torus containing accelerated condensed matter. The mainstream scientific community has accepted Forward's work.

A variant of Burkhard Heim's theory by Walter Dröscher, Institut für Grenzgebiete der Wissenschaft (IGW), Innsbruck, Austria, and Jocham Häuser, University of Applied Sciences and CLE GmbH, Salzgitter, Germany, predicted a repulsive force field of gravitophotons could be produced by a ring rotating above a very strong magnetic field. Heim's theory, and its variants, have been treated by the mainstream scientific community as fringe physics. But the works by Forward, Dröscher, and Häuser could not be considered as a form of repulsor- or tractor-beam because the predicted impulses and field effects were not confined to a well-defined, collimated region.

The following are summaries of other notable experiments and theories that resemble repulsor and tractor beam concepts:

=== 1960s ===
In July 1960, trade magazine Missiles and Rockets reported that Martin N. Kaplan, a research engineer at Ryan Aeronautical Company, had conducted experiments that could lead to an ability to direct an anti-gravitational force toward or away from a second body.

In 1964, physicists Leopold Halpern of the Niels Bohr Institute and B. Laurent of the Nordic Institute for Theoretical Physics indicated general relativity theory and quantum theory allowed the generation and amplification of gravitons in a manner like the laser. They showed, in principle, gravitational radiation in the form of a beam of gravitons could be generated and amplified by using induced, resonant emissions.

=== 1990s – Podkletnov experiment ===
In 1992, Professor Yevgeny Podkletnov and R. Nieminen, of the Tampere University of Technology, claimed to have discovered weight fluctuations in objects above an electromagnetically levitated, massive, composite superconducting disk. Three years later, Podkletnov reported the results of additional experiments with a toroidal disk superconductor. They reported the weight of the samples would fluctuate between −2.5% and +5.4% as the angular speed of the superconductor increased. Certain combinations of disk angular speeds and electromagnetic frequencies caused the fluctuations to stabilize at a 0.3% reduction. The experiments with the toroidal disk yielded reductions that reached a maximum of 1.9–2.1%. Reports about both sets of experiments stated the weight loss region was cylindrical, extending vertically for at least three meters above the disk. Qualitative observations of an expulsive force at the border of the shielded zone were reported in the Fall of 1995. Several groups around the world tried to replicate Podkletnov's gravity shielding observations.

Italian physicist Giovanni Modanese, while a Von Humboldt Fellow at the Max Planck Institute for Physics, made the first attempt to provide a theoretical explanation of Podkletnov's alleged observations. He argued that the shielding effect and slight expulsive force at the border of the shielded zone could be explained in terms of induced changes in the local cosmological constant. Modanese described several effects regarding responses to modifications to the local cosmological constant within the superconductor. Ning Wu of the Institute of High Energy Physics (Beijing), used the quantum gauge theory of gravity he had developed in 2001 to explain Podkletnov's observations. Wu's theory approximated the relative gravity loss as 0.03%, or an order of magnitude smaller than the reported range of 0.3–0.5%.

C. S. Unnikrishan, Tata Institute of Fundamental Research, Mumbai, showed that if the effect had been caused by gravitational shielding, the shape of the shielded region would be similar to a shadow from the gravitational shield. For example, the shape of the shielded region above a disk would be conical. The height of the cone's apex above the disk would vary directly with the height of the shielding disk above the earth. Podkletnov and Nieminen described the shape of the weight loss region as a cylinder that extended through the ceiling above the cryostat.

=== 2010s ===
A team of scientists at the Australian National University (ANU) led by Professor Andrei Rode created a device similar to a tractor beam to move small particles 1.5 meters through the air. Rather than create a new gravitational field, however, the device utilizes a doughnut-shaped Laguerre-Gaussian laser beam, which has a high-intensity ring of light that surrounds a dark core along the beam axis. This method confines particles to the center of the beam using photophoresis, whereby illuminated sections of the particle have a higher temperature and thus impart more momentum to air molecules incident on the surface. Owing to this method, such a device cannot work in space due to lack of air. Rode states that there are practical applications for the device on Earth, for example, the transportation of microscopic hazardous materials and other microscopic objects.

John Sinko and Clifford Schlecht researched a form of reversed-thrust laser propulsion as a macroscopic laser tractor beam. Intended applications include remotely manipulating space objects at distances up to about 100 km, removal of space debris, and retrieval of adrift astronauts or tools on-orbit.

Functioning tractor beams based on solenoidal modes of light were demonstrated in 2010 by physicists at New York University. The spiraling intensity distribution in these non-diffracting beams tends to trap illuminated objects and thus helps to overcome the radiation pressure that ordinarily would drive them down the optical axis. Orbital angular momentum transferred from the solenoid beam's helical wavefronts then drives the trapped objects upstream along the spiral. Both Bessel-beam and solenoidal tractor beams are being considered for applications in space exploration by NASA.

In March 2011, scientists from Fudan University and Hong Kong University of Science and Technology posited that a specific type of Bessel beam (a special kind of laser that does not diffract at the center) is capable of creating a pull-like effect on a given microscopic particle, forcing it toward the beam-source. The underlying physics is the maximization of forward scattering via interference of the radiation multipoles. They show explicitly that the necessary condition to realize a negative (pulling) optical force is the simultaneous excitation of multipoles in the particle. If the total photon momentum projection along the propagation direction is small, attractive optical force is possible. The Chinese scientists suggest this possibility may be implemented for optical micromanipulation.

In 2013, scientists at the Institute of Scientific Instruments (ISI) and the University of St Andrews created a tractor beam that pulls objects on a microscopic level. The study states that this technique may have potential for bio-medical research. Professor Zemanek said: "The whole team have spent a number of years investigating various configurations of particles delivery by light." Dr. Brzobohaty said: "These methods are opening new opportunities for fundamental photonics as well as applications for life-sciences." Dr Cizmar said: "Because of the similarities between optical and acoustic particle manipulation we anticipate that this concept will inspire exciting future studies in areas outside the field of photonics."

Physicists from ANU built a reversible tractor beam, capable of transporting particles "one fifth of a millimetre in diameter a distance of up to 20 centimetres, around 100 times further than previous experiments." According to Professor Wieslaw Krolikowski, of the Research School of Physics and Engineering, "demonstration of a large scale laser beam like this is a kind of holy grail for laser physicists." The work was published in Nature in 2014. In the same year, Dr. Horst Punzmann and his team at ANU developed a tractor beam that works on water, which could potentially be used to contain oil spills, control floating objects, or study the formation of rips on beaches.

In 2015, a team of researchers built the world's first sonic tractor beam that can lift and move objects using sound waves. An Instructables webpage was made available with instructions to build a rudimentary device.

In 2016, Rice University scientists discovered that Tesla coils can generate force fields able to manipulate matter through a process called teslaphoresis.

In December 2016, researchers were able to manipulate the movement of bacterial cells using a tractor beam, thereby opening the possibility that tractor beams could have future applications in biological sciences.

In 2018, a research team from Tel-Aviv University, led by Dr. Alon Bahabad, experimentally demonstrated an optical analog of the Archimedes' screw where the rotation of a helical-intensity laser beam is transferred to the axial motion of optically trapped micrometer-scale, airborne, carbon-based particles. With this optical screw, particles were easily conveyed with controlled velocity and direction, upstream or downstream of the optical flow, over half a centimeter.

In 2019, researchers at the University of Washington used a tractor beam to assemble nanoscale materials in a process they describe as "photonic nanosoldering".

== Fiction ==
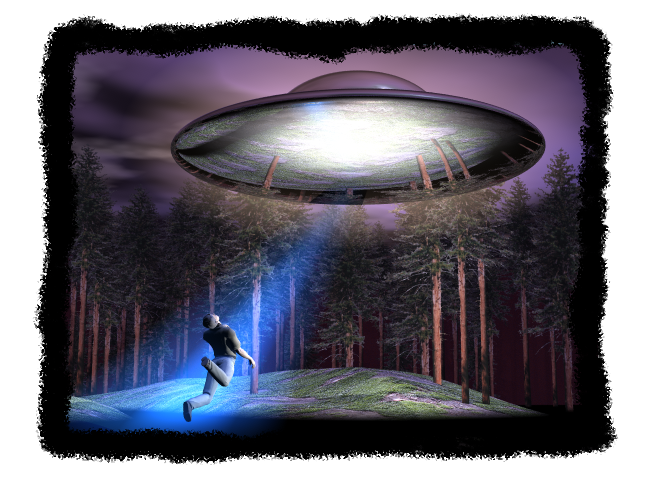
Illustration of man being abducted by aliens with a tractor beam

Science fiction movies and telecasts normally depict tractor and repulsor beams as audible, narrow rays of visible light covering a small target area. Tractor beams are most commonly used on spaceships and space stations. They are generally used in three ways:

1. As a device for securing or retrieving cargo, passengers, shuttlecraft, etc. This is analogous to cranes on modern ships.
2. As a device to harness objects that can then be used as impromptu weapons by the craft
3. As a means of preventing an enemy from escaping, analogous to grappling hooks.

In the latter case, countermeasures can usually be employed against tractor beams. These may include pressor beams (a stronger pressor beam will counteract a weaker tractor beam) or plane shears a.k.a. shearing planes (a device to "cut" the tractor beam and render it ineffective). In some fictional realities, shields can block tractor beams, or the generators can be disabled by sending a large amount of energy along the beam to its source.

Tractor beams and pressor beams can be used together as a weapon: by attracting one side of an enemy spaceship while repelling the other, one can create severely damaging shear effects in its hull. Another mode of destructive use of such beams is rapid alternating between pressing and pulling force in order to cause structural damage to the ship as well as inflicting lethal forces on its crew.

Two objects being brought together by a tractor beam are usually attracted toward their common center of gravity. This means that if a small spaceship applies a tractor beam to a large object such as a planet, the ship will be drawn toward the planet, rather than vice versa.

In Star Trek, tractor beams are imagined to work by placing a target in the focus of a subspace/graviton interference pattern created by two beams from an emitter. When the beams are manipulated correctly the target is drawn along with the interference pattern. The target may be moved toward or away from the emitter by changing the polarity of the beams. The range of the beam affects the maximum mass that the emitter can move, and the emitter subjects its anchoring structure to significant force.

=== Literature ===
- Rudyard Kipling's As Easy as A.B.C. (1912) made use of the "flying loop", generated by one of the airships of the Aerial Board of Control, when a woman tried, as a political statement, to publicly kill herself. The loop pulled the knife from her hand and, instead of drawing it toward the airship, flung it fifty yards away; it also continued to hold her arm rigid for a second or so afterward. John Brunner, in the foreword to a collection of Kipling's science fiction, said this may be the first depiction of a tractor beam.
- E. E. Smith coined the term "tractor beam" (an update of his earlier "attractor-beam") in his novel Spacehounds of IPC, originally serialized in Amazing Stories magazine in 1931. The hero of his Skylark of Space books (1929 onwards) had invented "attractor beams" and "repellor beams". Repellors can also be emitted isotropically as a defensive force field against material projectiles. The device also appears in Smith's Lensman books.
- In Philip Francis Nowlan's Buck Rogers novel Armageddon 2419 A.D. (1928), the enemy airships used "repellor beams" for support and propulsion, similar to the "eighth ray" beams used for support and propulsion of Martian airships in the Barsoom/John Carter of Mars series (first published 1912–1943) by Edgar Rice Burroughs.
- Tom Swift – In the Tom Swift Jr. book Tom Swift and The Deep-Sea Hydrodome (1958), Tom invents the "repellatron". The device can be set to repel specific chemical elements. It was used to create a bubble habitat on the ocean floor, and as the propulsion system for his spacecraft Challenger.
- The Sector General books by James White: The 1963 novel Star Surgeon is the source of the combined tractor/pressor beam weapon called the Rattler. The weapon attracts then repels the target (an entire ship or a segment of the ship's hull) at 80 gs, several times a minute. The novel also featured a type of force field called a "repulsion screen".
- The Trigger by Arthur C. Clarke involves the development of tractor beams in the early part of the novel.
- Sixth Column by Robert A. Heinlein describes tractor/pressor beams as a product of the physics of a "newly-discovered magneto-gravitic or electro-gravitic spectra" featured in the novel.

=== Comics ===
- Buck Rogers comic strip – originally just repulsor-beams; tractors appeared by the 1970s
- Iron Man's various armor suits usually feature repulsor beam projectors mounted in the palms as one of the main weapon systems.

=== Movies and television series ===
- Star Trek (TV series, films, books and games). One of the most visible and iconic uses of the concept. One of the few prominent fictitious depictions which used such beams repeatedly and referred to them consistently as tractor beams.
- District 9 The 2009 film featured a tractor beam lifting the command module dropship as a major plot point at the end of the movie.

== See also ==
- Force field (physics)
- Optical lift
- Optical tweezers
- Optical levitation
- Psychokinesis
- Stasis field
