= Mind Changer =

1998 novel by James White

- First edition, published by Tor Books. Cover art by John Berkey.
- Author: James White
- Language: English
- Publisher: Tor Books
- Publication date: 1998
- ISBN: 0-312-86663-1 (first edition)
- Dewey Decimal: 823.912
- LC Class: PR6073.H494 M5

Mind Changer is a 1998 science fiction book by Northern Irish author James White, part of his Sector General series.

== Plot summary ==
Sector General's director O'Mara is headed for retirement. His memories of life at the hospital are shown through flashbacks, while in the book's 'present' time he goes through the process of selecting his own replacement.

== Reception ==
Publishers Weekly described Mind Changer as "White's finest performance, replete with wit, originality, medical expertise and sheer decency" and commented that the series shows no signs of aging, and Booklist described the book as an "enjoyable, witty resumé" of Chief Psychologist O'Mara's career. Todd Richmond wrote that the Sector General series declined after Star Healer (1985), hitting a low point with The Galactic Gourmet (1996), and that the later books tended to stretch a short story's worth of content to the length of a novel. However he thought that Mind Changer (1998) represented an improvement.
