= Organ transplantation in fiction =

Organ transplantation is a common theme in science fiction and horror fiction, appearing as early as 1925, in Russian short story Professor Dowell's Head. It may be used as a device to examine identity, power and loss of power, current medical systems; explore themes of bodily autonomy; or simply as a vehicle for body horror or other fantastical plots. Organ transplantation in fiction is often used as horror and something that harms the people involved, in contrast to how organ donation is presented in real life, as something hopefully good for those involved.

The circumstances of organ transplantation in fiction can vary widely. Numerous horror movies feature the theme of transplanted body parts that are evil or give supernatural powers, such as in the films Body Parts, Hands of a Stranger, and The Eye. Organ transplants from donors who are unwilling, or incapable of objecting, to having their organs removed are a recurring theme in dystopian fiction. In contrast to unwilling organ donors, there is the theme of individuals who want to donate their own life-critical organs, such as a brain or heart, at the cost of their own life.

As is common in science fiction, writing about organ donation can be a way to speculate on the future of science, medicine, and autonomy, based on what occurs in the present.

Narratives about organ transplants in science fiction are so widely known in public consciousness that they are occasionally referenced alongside actual medical technology developments. Explaining the advancements of his company, Revivicor, into xenotransplantation technology, David Ayares told NPR that, "[I]t's no longer a science fiction experiment. [...] It's actually a reality." Examples of casually referring to science fiction while talking about actual transplant technology can also be seen in articles such as "Beyond Science Fiction: Xenotransplantation Becoming Clinical Reality"; "Kidney xenotransplantation: Future clinical reality or science fiction?"; and "Science Fiction Comes Alive as Researchers Grow Organs in Lab".

== Organ theft ==
The term "organlegging" was coined by Larry Niven in a series of short stories set in his Known Space future universe originally published in a 1976 collection called The Long ARM of Gil Hamilton, later expanded and re-released as Flatlander. The story The Patchwork Girl was also published alone as a novel in 1986.

In Robin Cook's 1978 novel Coma, set in the present day, the organ thieves operate in a hospital, removing the organs from patients in a facility for the long-term care of patients in a vegetative state. The story was also made into a film, Coma in 1978, and later into a two-part television miniseries aired in 2012 on the A&E television network.

Organ theft is a theme in a number of horror movies, including Turistas, and also (in a less overtly horrific manner) as a theme in realistic dramas such as Dirty Pretty Things and Inhale.

In the TV series Trigun, the protagonist's severed left arm had been transplanted without his knowledge onto an antagonist's left shoulder.

Theft of organs, with different variations, appears in urban legends around the world. One such story, about sacaojos, or eye thieves, was popular in Latin America in the 1990s. In this story, children are kidnapped by foreigners and their eyes are removed, then the children are returned. This led to several instances in real life of foreigners being distrusted on suspicion of being kidnappers.

Another common urban legend about organ theft is that of the stolen kidney. This story began in Europe in the 1990s. The basic structure, whether reported orally or by media, is that a businessperson is traveling abroad, and is then abducted or seduced, and wakes up later with their kidneys having been removed, maybe noticing a dramatic scar on their lower back. This attracted real-world action, with some countries such as Germany warning their citizens to be cautious abroad. No real evidence was found for the stories that initially powered this legend. This story works as a cautionary tale to be aware of strangers, or as a tragedy of exploitation if the victims were children or had minimal agency, and fueled xenophobia.

== State-sanctioned organ transplants from criminals ==
As organ transplants became more feasible in real life, the issue of not having enough donor organs for all those who needed them became apparent. Some themes across organ transplant fiction involve various ways that the organ supply can be boosted and this problem can be solved, such as through state-organized systems that make more organs available.

The same series of Larry Niven stories also contains the theme of organ donation from criminals becoming institutionalized within society to the point where even minor crimes are punished by death, in order to ensure the supply of new organs to an aging population. Niven originally developed this theme in his novel A Gift From Earth, first published in 1968 and also set in his Known Space universe. In A Gift From Earth, the descendants of colonists from an interstellar colonization mission are preyed upon by the descendants of the crew, who enact laws that make even the most minor offences carry the death penalty to allow their organs to be "harvested" and stored in "organ banks" for later use.

The theme had previously been explored by Frederik Pohl and Jack Williamson in their 1964 novel The Reefs of Space, the first novel of their Starchild Trilogy, in which mankind labours under the "Plan of Man", enforced by computers within a surveillance state. Unlike in Niven's novels, donors are kept alive for as long as possible to enable more organs to be removed for transplant until they eventually succumb from their injuries. The novel also features a Frankenstein-like theme of a man assembled entirely from the body parts of others.

In Sui Ishida's 2014 dark fantasy manga series, Tokyo Ghoul, a state sanctioned organ transplant is performed between an unwilling donor and the main character of the series. It was the subject of much controversy in the series itself. Unbeknown to the surgeons however, the unwilling donor was a ghoul, a monster who eats human flesh, causing the main character to have ghoul-like characteristics.

== Organ transplants from victims raised to be organ donors ==
The idea of state-sanctioned involuntary organ transplants is taken one step further by the concept of creating people solely for the purpose of acting as organ donors. Generally, these donors are clones of their eventual organ recipients. This idea has been explored by several writers, and is another way that fiction explores various solutions to the problem of not having enough donor organs for those that need them.

The 1979 science fiction horror film Parts: The Clonus Horror, written by Bob Sullivan and Ron Smith, is set in an isolated community in a remote desert area, where clones are bred to serve as a source of replacement organs for the wealthy and powerful. The clones are kept in a seemingly idyllic environment of apparent leisure and luxury, right up to the point where they are killed for their organs.

Michael Marshall Smith's novel Spares has a similar premise. Unlike the clones in Parts: The Clonus Horror, the clones are kept in conditions resembling those of farm animals or a concentration camp.

The central character of Alfred Slote's 1982 children's book Clone Catcher pursues clones who seek to escape their fate of being harvested for their organs.

The 2005 American science fiction action thriller film The Island continues the theme, where clones live in a highly structured environment isolated in a compound. The hero escapes after learning that the inhabitants are clones used for organ harvesting and surrogate motherhood for wealthy people in the outside world.

Kazuo Ishiguro's 2005 dystopian novel Never Let Me Go also has a similar theme to its predecessors, but lacks the action-adventure theme of the previous works, concentrating on the characters' feelings and personal stories and the development of psychological horror at their plight. It was later made into a 2010 British drama film of the same name. Author Jay Clayton noted that the in-universe portrayal of the public reaction to the discovery of a school where clones are raised to be organ donors draws comparisons to retrospective reactions to real-world situations such as enslavement in the United States, Tuskegee Syphilis Study, and medical experimentation by Nazis. Another author reviewing Never Let Me Go argued that it follows a similar structure to boarding school novels, where a youth grows up to fully realize their purpose, traditionally being a vocation and here being to become an organ donor. With this comparison, idea of building one's identity around their vocation is criticized.

The commissioned four-part radio play Jefferson 37 by Jenny Stephens also explores the same theme, and was first broadcast on BBC Radio 4 Extra in 2006. The whole plot takes place within Abbotsville, a free range laboratory, where the clones are deliberately dehumanised. The story culminates with their humanity resisting the desire to quash it.

The plot of Unwind, a 2007 science fiction novel by young adult literature author Neal Shusterman, takes place in the United States, after a civil war somewhere in the near future. After a civil war is fought over abortion, a compromise was reached, allowing parents to sign an order for their children between the ages of 13 and 18 years old to be "unwound"—taken to "harvest camps" and having their body parts harvested for later use. The reasoning was that, since all their organs were required to be used, unwinds did not technically die, because their individual body parts lived on.

In 1968, the Indian author Kottayam Pushpanath published Chuvanna Manushyan, his literary debut. It was published in the Malayalam Manorajyam weekly. It is a story that a famous professor Jane, a surgeon that was famous for her experiments trying to keep organs from recent corpses alive.

== Organ repossession ==
The idea of the repossession of transplanted organs has also been used in fiction, in the films Repo Men, and Repo! The Genetic Opera.

== Self-sacrificial organ donation ==
In the film John Q., the character played by Denzel Washington takes a hospital hostage in hopes to force the surgical staff to transplant his heart into his dying son. In the TV series Psycho-Pass, the antagonist is given the opportunity to donate his brain to help power a system that determines if an someone is likely to perform a crime.

== Xenotransplantation ==
Xenotransplantation, the practive of transplanting organs across species, has also been featured in fiction.

Activist Carol J. Adams has said that the beliefs that lead to xenotransplantation are often rooted in the idea that human life is more valuable than animal lives and therefore animals can be treated differently. Author Cat Yampbell contrasts this with the character of Dr. Franklin of Ann Halam's Dr. Franklin's Island, where the experimenter shows disregard for both human and animal life. In these ways, xenotransplantation fiction can explore animal rights.

Yampbell argues again that in another book with a xenotransplantation plot, Eva by Peter Dickinson, the recipient's experience reveals to her how comparatively few rights nonhuman animals get, when she is treated as an nonhuman animal due to her received chimpanzee body parts.

Xenotransplantation narratives, when they show the perspective of a non-human animal or a human with parts of a non-human animal, can give a "subjecthood" to non-human animals that is not often granted.

== Comedy ==
Organ transplantation has also been used as a major plot element in a number of comedies, including Przekładaniec (1968, Poland), The Thing with Two Heads (1972) and The Man With Two Brains (1983).

In 1998, The Chicken in Black, song by Johnny Cash, relates a man having severe head aches. A surgeon performs a brain transplant : his brain is replaced by one belonging to a bank robber who was killed the night before, and his own brain was put into a chicken.

== See also ==
- Organ trade
  - Organ transplantation in China, for a real-world counterpart of some of the themes here
  - Organ theft in Kosovo
- Brain transplant
- Cyborgs in fiction
