= The Galactic Gourmet =

1996 novel by James White

- First edition, published by Tor Books. Cover art by John Berkey.
- Author: James White
- Language: English
- Publisher: Tor Books
- Publication date: 1996
- ISBN: 0-312-86167-2 (first edition)
- Dewey Decimal: 823.914
- LC Class: PR6073.H494 G35

The Galactic Gourmet is a 1996 science fiction book by Northern Irish author James White, part of the Sector General series.

The book also is notable for its ultimate focus on the merits of vegetarianism, which White achieves by humorously 'skewering' passionate commitment to a meat-based diet among the endangered Wemar race.

== Plot ==
A famous chef wangles an appointment to Sector General for the challenge of creating food for so many different species. Like the Sommaradvan healer Cha Thrat (Code Blue – Emergency), he creates chaos everywhere he goes.

He first meets the swimming "crocodile-like" Chaldars, who complain that their food is unsatisfying. Realising that they are accustomed to capturing their food live, he develops motile food for them. They are delighted, but they completely destroy their hospital ward charging around chasing it.

Next, he learns that the spray-on food used to nourish the Hudlar is uninteresting. His investigations show that it needs small toxins to "flavor" it, which would be found naturally on their home planet. He visits a Hudlar ship, but causes a huge cargo bay accident expelling him into space. He rescues himself by riding some sprayers back to the station, but is in everyone's bad books.

Sympathetic staffers hide him on the ambulance ship Rhabwar for an upcoming assignment. In the meantime, an epidemic at the hospital turns out to be a major nutmeg overdose caused by a sous-chef foolishly using ten times the required amount in a recipe.

The Rhabwar is sent to a starving planet, whose people think their dwindling meat supply is the only desirable food and are shamed by its lack. He is able to commune with their first Cook better than the diplomats are doing. He finds ways to improve their sad vegetarian diet, and helps to set more positive attitudes toward it. The Cook's son is wounded on a game-hunting expedition, and the medical ship takes him on board for healing. The populace grows very angry, mystifying the team. They finally recall the aliens' cannibal tradition and produce him alive.

== Reception ==
Todd Richmond wrote that the Sector General series declined after Star Healer (1985), hitting a low point with The Galactic Gourmet, and that the later books tended to stretch a short story's worth of content to the length of a novel. Other fans appreciate this novel as a high point in White's use of alien point-of-view to provide insight into social interactions and the resolution of crises.
