= Ambulance Ship =

- Cover of the first edition
- Author: James White
- Cover artist: Dean Ellis
- Language: English
- Series: Sector General
- Genre: Science fiction
- Publisher: Del Rey Books
- Publication date: 1979
- Publication place: United States
- Media type: Print (hardcover)
- Pages: 184 pp
- ISBN: 0-345-28513-1
- OCLC: 5883469
- Preceded by: Major Operation
- Followed by: Sector General

Ambulance Ship is a 1979 science fiction short story collection by Northern Irish author James White, part of his Sector General series.

== Stories ==
- "Contagion" – An ancient generation ship is found whose last occupants died only months before. The rescue ship and ambulance crews come down with a mysterious illness.
- "Quarantine" – The sole survivor from a spacewreck is brought back to the hospital, and stuns everyone by downing half the surgical team.
- "Recovery" – A ship is found with absolutely no visible markings. A torture corridor inside beats on whatever passes, including a violent non-sentient and a telepathic sentient who communicates with the ambulance staff about the Blind Ones' need.

The 1980 Corgi edition has "Spacebird" as the first story.
