= The Genocidal Healer =

1992 novel by James White

- First edition, published by Del Rey Books. Cover art by Bruce Jensen.
- Author: James White
- Language: English
- Publication date: 1992

The Genocidal Healer is a 1992 science fiction novel by Northern Irish author James White, part of his Sector General series. Like the later books in the series, it stars an alien. However, the protagonist of the early Sector General stories, Dr. Conway, plays an important supporting role, as do other regular characters.

The early Sector General stories focus almost entirely on medical problems, but later ones such as The Genocidal Healer also deal with deeper issues. White said in an interview, "The Genocidal Healer is very philosophical and theological. I'm, as you know, a Catholic. If our parish priest ever reads The Genocidal Healer, I'm in deep trouble, because he's very old and very right wing."

== Plot ==
The dejected Surgeon-Captain Lioren is disappointed that his court-martial has rejected the death penalty for him, and instead has assigned him to O'Mara at Sector General. He is plagued with guilt, because he is responsible for the genocide of an entire race. At moments during his new tasks, he ponders the individual events that led up to the alien deaths.

First contact with the Cromsag planet was quickly followed by the discovery that their entire population was wasting away from some unidentified disease. They were starving, and their birth rate was abysmal. Additionally, they were continually in hand-to-hand combat with each other, presumably competing for food.

The Sector General ships hurriedly provided food to malnourished people everywhere, along with medical aid for combat injuries, and tried to determine the cause of the mysterious disease. Despite their best efforts, deaths from the plague continued to increase. Lioren grew frustrated with the slow process of sending samples back to Sector General and awaiting diagnostics and full tests to ensure the effectiveness of potential cures. In his arrogance, he administered a treatment to the entire population and they rose up and slaughtered each other, wiping out their own race.

Interspersed with recalling these events, he shares some of his story with people at Sector General. Lioren speaks to the terminally ill Dr. Mannen, eventually reviving Mannen's interest in life. Lioren also offers encouragement to the isolated alien Khone (see Star Healer). Next he is asked to speak to a gigantic Groalterri, whose race is so advanced they have until now refused all contact with the federated planets. The humans are desperate to make any sort of progress with this race, but the Groalterri patient won't communicate with anyone. Bit by bit, Lioren shares his own guilty history and talks the suicidal alien into lowering its emotional barriers. From its story he manages to figure out the Groalterri's hitherto unknown injury and arrange surgery that will change its life. Finally, Lioren meets with the handful of Cromsag survivors.
