= The Silent Stars Go By =

The Silent Stars Go By may refer to:

- The Silent Stars Go By (White novel), a 1991 science fiction novel by author James White
- The Silent Stars Go By (Abnett novel), a 2011 Doctor Who novel by Dan Abnett
