= Force field (fiction) =

Fictional technology or superpower

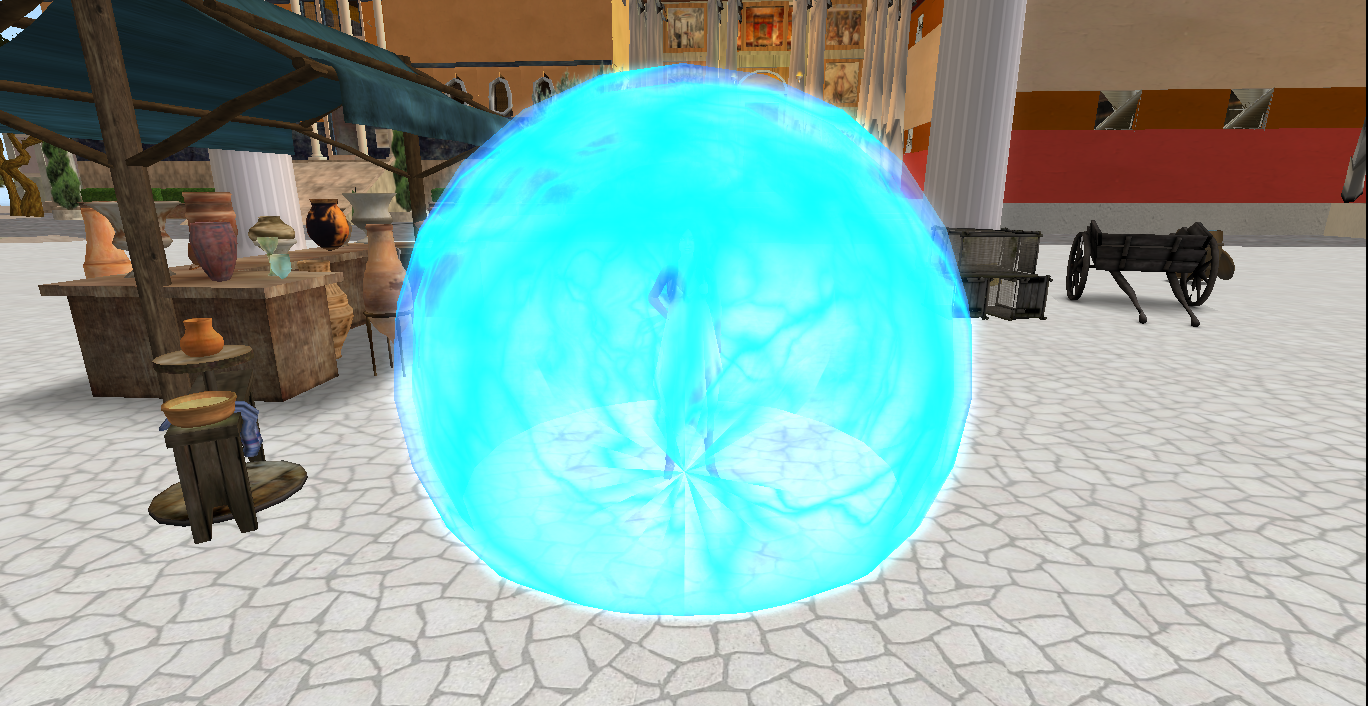
Energy shield from the game Second Life

In speculative fiction, a force field, sometimes known as an energy shield, force shield, energy bubble, or deflector shield, is a barrier produced by something like energy, negative energy, dark energy, electromagnetic fields, gravitational fields, electric fields, quantum fields, telekinetic fields, plasma, particles, radiation, solid light, magic, or pure force. It protects a person, area, or object from attacks or intrusions, or even deflects energy attacks back at the attacker. This fictional technology is created as a field of energy without matter that acts as a wall, so that objects affected by the particular force relating to the field are unable to pass through the field and reach the other side, instead being deflected or destroyed. Actual research in the 21st century has looked into the potential to deflect radiation or cosmic rays, as well as more extensive shielding.

This concept has become a staple of many science fiction works; authors frequently do not explain the concept, treating them as established fact and attributing whatever capabilities the plot requires. The ability to create force fields has become a frequent superpower in superhero media.

== History ==
The concept of a force field goes back at least as far as early 20th century. The Encyclopedia of Science Fiction suggests that the first use of the term in science fiction was in 1931, in Spacehounds of IPC by E.E. 'Doc' Smith.

An early precursor of what is now called "force field" may be found in Eugenio Taquechel's Spanish historical-fiction novel "La Alhambra Romántica: Leyenda Morisca" published in Madrid in 1928, where in its 11th chapter it describes (translated) "... in front of his palace a wall as thin as a hair, strong and transparent as a diamond, had been raised which defended from ..." An earlier precursor is that of William Hope Hodgson's The Night Land (1912), where the Last Redoubt, the fortress of the remnants of a far-future humanity, is kept safe by "The Air Clog" generated by the burning "Earth-Current". An even earlier precursor is Florence Carpenter Dieudonné's 1887 novel Rondah, or Thirty-Three Years in a Star, where the far-off Sun Island is enclosed by a "wall in the air" that blocks access by land, sea and air, which is occasionally disabled.

In Isaac Asimov's Foundation universe, personal shields have been developed by scientists specializing in the miniaturization of planet-based shields. As they are primarily used by Foundation Traders, most other inhabitants of the Galactic Empire do not know about this technology. In an unrelated short story Breeds There a Man...? by Asimov, scientists are working on a force field ("energy so channelled as to create a wall of matter-less inertia"), capable of protecting the population in case of a nuclear war. When activated by radiation, the force field becomes a solid hemisphere, completely opaque and reflective from both sides. Asimov explores the force field concept again in the short story Not Final!.

The concept of force fields as a defensive measure from enemy attack or as a form of attack can be regularly found in films such as The War of the Worlds (1953, George Pál) and Independence Day, as well as modern video games.

The ability to create a force field has been a common superpower in comic books and associated media. While only a few characters have the explicit ability to create force fields (for example, the Invisible Woman of the Fantastic Four and Violet Parr from The Incredibles), it has been emulated via other powers, such as Green Lantern's energy constructs, Jean Grey's telekinesis, and Magneto's manipulation of electromagnetic fields. Apart from this, its importance is also highlighted in Dr. Michio Kaku's books (such as Physics of the Impossible).

== Fiction ==
Science fiction and fantasy avenues suggest a number of potential uses of force fields:

- A barrier allowing workers to function in areas exposed to the vacuum of space. The atmosphere inside would be habitable by humans, while at the same time allowing permissible objects to pass through the barrier
- A walkable surface between two points without the necessity of building a bridge.
- An emergency quarantine area to service those afflicted by harmful biological or chemical agents
- A fire extinguisher where oxygen is exhausted by the use of a space confined by a force field thereby starving the fire
- As a shield to protect against damage from natural forces or an enemy attack
- As a deflector to allow fast spaceships to traverse space without colliding with small particles or objects.
- A temporary habitable space in an area otherwise unsuitable for sustaining life
- As a security apparatus used to confine or contain a captive

The capabilities and functionality of force fields vary; in some works of fiction (such as in the Star Trek universe), energy shields can nullify or mitigate the effects of both energy and particle (e.g., phasers) and conventional weapons. In many fictional scenarios, the shields function primarily as a defensive measure against weapons fired from other spacecraft. Force fields in these stories also generally prevent transporting. There are generally two kinds of force fields postulated: one in which energy is projected as a flat plane from emitters around the edges of a spacecraft and another where energy surrounds a ship like a bubble.

The ability to create force fields has become a frequent superpower in superhero media. While sometimes an explicit power on their own, force fields have also been attributed to other fictional abilities. Marvel Comics' Jean Grey is able to use her telekinesis to create a barrier of telekinetic energy that acts as a force field by repelling objects. Similarly, Magneto is able to use his magnetism to manipulate magnetic fields into acting as shields. The most common superpower link seen with force fields is the power of invisibility. This is seen with Marvel Comics' Invisible Woman and Disney Pixar's Violet Parr. A further variation on the force field is a protective armor which constantly encompasses the user, seen in characters such as Cecilia Reye's bio-field or Skid's frictionless force field.

Force fields often vary in what they are made of, though are commonly made of energy. The 2017 series The Gifted featured character Lauren Strucker who had the ability to create shields by pushing molecules together. This resulted in her being able to construct force fields out of air and water particles rather than energy.

== Research ==
In 2005, the NASA Institute for Advanced Concepts devised a way to protect from radiation by applying an electric field to spheres made of a thin, non-conductive material coated with a layer of gold with either positive or negative charges, which could be arranged to bend a stream of charged particles to protect from radiation.

In 2006, a University of Washington group in Seattle, Washington, had been experimenting with using a bubble of charged plasma, contained by a fine mesh of superconducting wire, to surround a spacecraft. This would protect the spacecraft from interstellar radiation and some particles without needing physical shielding.

The Rutherford Appleton Laboratory was in 2007 attempting to design an actual test satellite, which would orbit Earth with a charged plasma field around it.

In 2008, Cosmos Magazine reported on research into creating an artificial replica of Earth's magnetic field around a spacecraft to protect astronauts from dangerous cosmic rays. British and Portuguese scientists used a mathematical simulation to prove that it would be possible to create a "mini-magnetosphere" bubble several hundred meters across, possibly generated by a small uncrewed vessel that could accompany a future crewed mission to Mars.

In 2014, a group of students from the University of Leicester released a study describing functioning of spaceship plasma deflector shields.

In 2016, Rice University scientists discovered that Tesla coils can generate force fields able to manipulate matter (process called teslaphoresis).

== See also ==
- Force field (physics)
- Li's field
- Magic circle
- Plasma window
- Stasis (fiction)
- Telekinesis
- Tractor beam
