= Aliens Among Us (disambiguation) =

Aliens Among Us is a science-fiction anthology by Jack Dann and Gardner Dozois. It may also refer to:

- The Aliens Among Us, a 1969 collection of science-fiction stories by James White
- Aliens Among Us (TMNT 2003 Episode), a 2003 episode of Teenage Mutant Ninja Turtles
- Aliens Among Us (Scooby-Doo! Mystery Incorporated), a 2013 episode of Scooby-Doo! Mystery Incorporated

== See also ==
- Among Us, a 2018 online multiplayer social deduction game
