= Starchild Trilogy =

Set of science fiction novels by Frederik Pohl and Jack Williamson

- Author: Frederik Pohl & Jack Williamson

The Starchild Trilogy is a series of three science fiction novels written by Frederik Pohl and Jack Williamson. In the future depicted in this series, mankind is ruled by a brutal totalitarian government known as the Plan of Man, enforced by a computerized surveillance state.

The books in the series were:

- The Reefs of Space (1964)
- Starchild (1965)
- Rogue Star (1969)

An omnibus edition titled The Starchild Trilogy was first published by the Science Fiction Book Club in October 1977.

== Reception ==
Algis Budrys praised The Reefs of Space as "a most rewarding piece of science fiction . . . full of inventions [and] the constant generation of science-fiction ideas and science-fiction characters." However, he criticized its ending as "anticlimactic" and for its failure to resolve themes involving several prominent characters.
