= Star Surgeon =

1963 novel by James White

- First Edition
- Author: James White
- Cover artist: Richard M. Powers
- Language: English
- Series: Sector General
- Genre: Science fiction
- Publisher: Ballantine Books
- Publication date: 1963
- Media type: Print (hardback & paperback)
- Preceded by: Hospital Station
- Followed by: Major Operation

Star Surgeon is a 1963 science fiction book by Northern Irish author James White, part of his Sector General series.

== Synopsis ==
Dr Conway must deal with an unconscious patient, classification ELPH, who may be a cannibal or a demigod, or both. It came from the "other galaxy", and the species is well known, almost infamous, to the Ians, who are also from another galaxy. It is extremely long-lived, and regularly takes complete rejuvenation treatments, including the brain and memory, to keep itself young. By doing this, it is practically immortal. It, although unconscious, appeared to have the ability to negate the most powerful drugs and resist surgery to cure its skin condition. This later turned out to be the work of the entity's "doctor", who is an intelligent, organised collection of microscopic, virus-type cells. Once Doctor Conway realises this, he uses a wooden stake to make the ELPH's doctor focus itself in one small location, at which time it is removed from the ELPH, informed regarding the physiology-problems of its patient, and put back in. The patient, whose name is Lonvellin, quickly makes a full recovery, and it leaves to do what it does best: bona fide missions that involve taking backwards planetary cultures and pulling them up "by their bootstraps". His particular mission, this time, is to cure a diseased planet called Etla, and he recruits Dr Conway and the "Monitor Corps" to help him. When Lonvellin's efforts to aid the people of Etla threaten to expose rampant corruption, the empire that controls the planet of Etla declares war and attacks the Sector General space hospital.

Conway helps organise the evacuation of most of the station's staff and patients, and following the death or injury of more senior staff, becomes the most senior surviving physician. After a brutal series of attacks, and with the hospital on the brink of defeat, a group of Federation and Empire soldiers convince Conway to help in a mutiny against the Federation commander Dermod. The Empire soldiers had been told that the Federation had attacked Etla, rather than trying to help it, but seeing the way all casualties were treated equally on the station, and in particular witnessing Conway breaking down after failing to save the life of an alien Empire soldier, convinced them that they had been lied to.

== Characters ==
- Dr. Conway – The Doctor at Sector General who is in charge of the Lonvellin Case.
- Nurse Murchison – A Nurse at Sector General who has a romantic relationship with Conway.
- Lonvellin – Long-lived and benevolent alien. He is treated by Conway, and becomes a friend and ally of Sector General.
- O'Mara – Chief Psychologist at Sector General. He gives the commands and orders to all the Doctors.
