= Code Blue =

Code Blue may refer to:

- Code blue (emergency code), a hospital code used to indicate a patient requiring immediate resuscitation
- Code Blue (film), a 2011 Dutch film by Urszula Antoniak
- Code Blue (TV series), a Japanese drama series
- Code Blue (album), a 1990 album by Icehouse
- Code Blue (bull), No. 644, a world champion bucking bull
- Code Blue – Emergency, a 1987 science fiction novel by James White
- Code: Blue, a fictional organization in the Marvel Universe
- "Code Blue", a song by T.S.O.L. from Dance with Me

== See also ==
- Blue code of silence or blue wall of silence, a purported rule among police not to report on colleagues' misconduct
