= Final Diagnosis =

1997 novel by James White

- First edition, published by Tor Books. Cover art by John Berkey.
- Author: James White
- Language: English
- Publisher: Tor Books
- Publication date: 1997
- ISBN: 0-312-86148-6 (first edition)
- Dewey Decimal: 823.914
- LC Class: PR6073.H494 F56

Final Diagnosis is a 1997 science fiction novel by Northern Irish author James White, part of his Sector General series.

== Plot ==
A man suffering from multiple mysterious illnesses and allergic reactions is labelled a hypochondriac. Finally he is sent to Sector General as a last resort. He befriends his fellow alien patients, telling them his life history. Rather than dismissing his complaints, the attentive hospital doctors develop a theory, and bring him back to his home planet. At the scene of a childhood accident that seems to have started it all, explanations are found.
