= Code Blue – Emergency =

1987 novel by James White

- First edition cover (publ.Del Rey); Cover art by David B. Mattingly
- Author: James White
- Series: Sector General
- Publisher: Del Rey Books
- Publication date: June 12, 1987
- ISBN: 978-0-345-34172-3

Code Blue – Emergency is a 1987 science fiction novel by Northern Irish writer James White, part of his Sector General series.

White said in an interview that originally he intended to end the series with Star Healer (1985), by which time the central characters had reached the top levels in their careers. However Ballantine Books persuaded him to continue, and he extended the stories' range by introducing new central characters beginning with Code Blue – Emergency.

== Plot ==
The protagonist of the story is Sommaradvan healer Cha Thrat. She bravely saved a human pilot who crashlanded on her planet, despite a complete lack of knowledge about his physiology. Contact with her species was established by the accident, so knowledge of their social customs is still virtually non-existent. However, she is invited to join the Sector General staff.

Cha Thrat innocently wreaks havoc by following her instincts and social customs. First she befriends a hypochondriac Chalder. Next, she is invited to assist at a therapeutic surgery operation to amputate the limb of a Hudlar, which will prolong its life (following events depicted in the previous novel in the series, Star Healer). When given the honour of cutting the limb, she obliges – and then deliberately cuts her own arm off as well, in accordance with the custom of her people. Next she saves the untouchable patient Khone (see Star Healer), and then finds a weird parasite species on a derelict spaceship. Due to the chaos she causes, every department in the hospital now refuses to allow her near their patients. O'Mara values her unusual approaches, and decides to add her to his staff.
