= Sector General (collection) =

1983 science fiction story collection by James White

- First edition (publ. Del Rey Books) cover artist: Rick Sternbach
- Author: James White
- Language: English
- Publisher: Del Rey Books
- Publication date: 1983

Sector General is a 1983 science fiction story collection by author James White and is part of the Sector General series. The book includes four stories.

== Stories ==
- "Accident": A major accident at a multi-species spaceport inspires the two heroes who ended the human–Orligian war (MacEwan and Grawlya-Ki) to found Sector General.
- "Survivor": A giant snail spacewreck survivor transmits pain and fear while unconscious.
- "Investigation": A spacewreck scene seems to indicate amputations from each victim, causing ambulance commander Fletcher to suspect cannibalism.
- "Combined Operation": The scene of a spacewreck contains hundreds of pods, which turn out to be a colony ship carrying the last survivors of an alien race.

== Reception ==
Dave Langford reviewed Sector General for White Dwarf #95, and stated that "its foundling, and ever-intuitive Dr Conway struggles with three implausible new varieties of alien patient."

== Reviews ==
- Review by Dan Chow (1983) in Locus, #266 March 1983
- Review by Tom Easton (1983) in Analog Science Fiction/Science Fact, Mid-September 1983
- Review by Terry Broome (1988) in Paperback Inferno, #70
