= The Aliens Among Us =

1969 collection of short stories by James White

- First edition
- Author: James White
- Cover artist: Paul Lehr
- Language: English
- Genre: Science fiction
- Publisher: Ballantine Books
- Publication date: 1969
- ISBN: 0-552-08461-1

The Aliens Among Us (ISBN 0-552-08461-1) is a collection of science fiction short stories by James White, published in 1969.

== Contents ==
- "Countercharm" (in the Sector General series)
- "To Kill or Cure"
- "Red Alert"
- "Tableau" (in the Sector General series)
- "The Conspirators"
- "The Scavengers"
- "Occupation: Warrior" (originally intended to be a Sector General story, but was re-written)
