= Double Contact =

1999 book by James White

- First edition cover (publ. by Tor Books; Cover art by John Harris
- Author: James White
- Publisher: Tor Books
- Publication date: January 1, 1999
- ISBN: 978-0-312-87041-6

Double Contact is a 1999 science fiction book by Irish writer James White, the last in the Sector General series.

This book has an unusual feature in personal pronoun usage: in most Sector General stories, one human is "he" or "she" (or other grammatical case forms) and one alien is "it". But, in Double Contact, often in the text the character Prilicla is "he" and a human or a member of any other species is "it".

== Reception ==
Clinton Lawrence described Double Contact as "in a very positive way, a throwback to an earlier era in science fiction" since it is optimistic and depicts several advanced species working harmoniously. The struggle to build trust and produce a successful first contact is, he thought, as exciting and suspenseful as one could wish for. However, Lawrence also noted that the level of characterisation was the minimum required to support the plot.
