= The Dream Millennium =

1974 novel by James White

- First edition (UK)
- Author: James White
- Cover artist: John Price
- Language: English
- Release number: 1st Edition
- Genre: Science Fiction
- Publisher: Michael Joseph (UK); Ballantine Books (US)
- Publication date: 1974
- ISBN: 071811227X 1st Edition
- Age Level: Young Adults

The Dream Millennium is a 1974 science fiction novel by Northern Irish writer James White. The plot revolves around the captain of a starship who, along with the rest of the people on board, is fleeing a dystopian Earth, with the launch taking place around the year 2170.

== Plot summary ==
John Devlin, a 26-year-old medical doctor, is the captain of a sleeper ship built to colonize planets in other solar systems. The spacecraft's trajectory is such that it will make passes of eleven stars thought to have a good chance of supporting habitable planets, over the course of about a thousand years. Most of the starship's systems are automated, so Devlin does not have to do much maintenance, but he is required to look at potential planets for colonization and solve problems as they arise. Except for being awoken at long intervals to eat, exercise, and perform his duties as captain, Devlin spends all of his time in hibernation, during which he dreams the entire lives of people and other creatures that lived and died on Earth in the past.

The story switches back and forth between Devlin's life and dreams on the starship and his life on Earth before the starship's launch. On the starship, Devlin's dreams during hibernation are the lives of creatures of the prehistoric past, then as men, moving closer to the present day with each dream. Most of the lives he dreams are unpleasant, with painful deaths. He dreams of being:

- a microorganism floating in the primordial ocean
- a trilobite forced to take greater and greater risks to find more and more food as he grows, until his luck runs out
- a vegetarian dinosaur, who survives an attack by a predator only to die later of gangrene when the wounds the predator inflicted become infected
- the runt of a litter of small, primitive mammals
- a medieval king, who wins a glorious battle in his youth but is compelled to turn to deceit as he ages to keep his kingdom in order
- in the modern era, a smooth-talking salesman who dies in an automobile accident
- a soldier killed in action during urban warfare
- an airline pilot killed during a hijacking
- a schoolteacher who becomes an early casualty of a nuclear war
- Devlin's own father

In the first half of the starship's voyage, Devlin finds only two planets that had any potential for human colonization, and found both unsuitable. One planet was entering Roche's limit and would not remain habitable for much longer, and the other was already inhabited by hostile aliens whose planet was in even worse shape than the Earth he had left behind.

Devlin's life on Earth had been unpleasant. Although Earth's economy was strong, the abundance of food, consumer goods, and leisure time did not make people happy. Pollution and overcrowding reduced quality of life, and boredom led inevitably to crime and violence. This, in turn, led to the formation of rival bands of vigilantes, who turned on each other when they had stamped out crime. The government had abandoned its efforts to intervene in the violence, instead using the police force only to contain it when it broke out.

People had become very thin-skinned and sensitive to any perceived slight, and disputes were usually settled by duelling. Guns and military-grade weapons were available to most civilians, making the violence very bloody indeed, and keeping the doctor busy treating gunshot wounds of those lucky enough not to be killed.

Men were considered full citizens only if they were armed. Those who chose to go unarmed became second class citizens. Unarmed sheep, as they were called, were prohibited from duelling and could not be called out, but they were always considered to be in the wrong in a dispute. Women were chattel. Certain men, Devlin among them, were legally considered full citizens even though unarmed, because of their professions (in Devlin's case, a doctor). In practice, though, these technical citizens got little respect from regular citizens, many of whom were little more than thugs and bullies.

Immersed in this decaying society, Devlin realizes that to make even his own life tolerable will be a daunting task, but he goes about it the best he can, until he meets a pastor, Brother Howard, who believes that the decay of society will accelerate into a final collapse when population growth and exhaustion of natural resources bring down the only remaining healthy human institution, the economy. If mankind is to survive, he says, it must colonize the stars. Brother Howard wants to recruit Devlin and his girl friend, Patricia Morley, for the starship.

After their encounter with the aliens, Devlin makes several unsettling discoveries. One is that everyone on board the ship is having the same, or almost the same, dreams during hibernation. Another is that the dreams are slowly driving him insane, along with everyone else on the ship, driving one colonist to suicide. With Morley's help, he solves these problems, only to be presented with a new problem. The starship's electronic and electromechanical systems are failing as the starship ages. Only one more potentially habitable world can be reached before the life support systems begin to fail en masse, and Devlin and Morley discover to their horror that the world is inhabited by the same species of alien that attacked the ship during the flyby of one of the earlier star systems.

Faced with the alternative of dying with the starship as it travels forever as a derelict hulk, they decide to land on the world anyway and take their chances with the aliens. Once in orbit around the planet, preparing to land, Devlin and Morley find that the aliens fled their home world for the same reason they themselves fled Earth, to escape from the pollution and violence of their home world to found their own space colony, a possibility that neither Devlin nor Morley had thought of. These aliens are happy to coexist with humans, and welcome them to their new home.
