= The Watch Below =

1966 science fiction novel by James White

- First US edition, published by Ballantine Books. Cover art by George Ziel.
- Author: James White
- Language: English
- Publication date: 1966

The Watch Below (1966) is a science fiction novel by British writer James White about a colony of humans stranded underwater in a sunken ship, who survive by air pockets, and a water-breathing alien species in search of a new home. The two generation ships encounter each other in the Earth's ocean.

== Reception ==
Algis Budrys of Galaxy Science Fiction liked the novel, stating that it was the first generation ship story to expand on Robert Heinlein's Orphans of the Sky.

== See also ==
- List of underwater science fiction works
