= Hospital Station =

Book by James White

- First edition cover
- Author: James White
- Language: English
- Series: Sector General
- Genre: Anthology
- Publisher: Ballantine
- Publication date: 1962
- Media type: Print (hardback & paperback)
- Pages: 192
- Preceded by: None
- Followed by: Star Surgeon

Hospital Station is a 1962 science fiction book by British author James White, the first volume in the Sector General series. The book collects together a series of five short stories previously published in New Worlds magazine between 1957 and 1960.

== Stories ==
- "Medic" – During the construction of Sector 12 General Hospital, construction worker O'Mara is suspected of negligently causing the death of two alien workers. Pending an investigation he is restricted to quarters and given the aliens' child to care for.
- "Sector General" – The first story of the main series' narrative. Doctor Conway has spent two months on the station and is about to be confronted with several emergencies as well as his first educator tape.
- "Trouble with Emily" – Conway is ordered to assist with a project involving a large dinosaur-like alien, dubbed Emily (after Emily Brontë) for its supposed resemblance to Brontosaurus.
- "Visitor at Large" – A SRTT shape-changing alien runs amok in the hospital. Conway and a newly arrived Prilicla are enlisted to capture it.
- "Out-Patient" – Following the recovery of a badly injured alien from a wrecked ship, Conway must pursue a radical treatment.
