= Second Ending =

1961 novel by James White

Cover from 1962 as an Ace Double F-173 together with The Jewels of Aptor by Samuel R. Delany. (publ. Ace Books)

Second Ending is a science fiction novel by Great British writer James White, published in June 1961. It first appeared in Fantastic Stories of Imagination edited by Cele Goldsmith and publish by Ziff Davis.

Short listed for the Hugo Award, it tells the story of the only human survivor on Earth after a series of nuclear wars, accompanied by a group of robots.
