= The Escape Orbit =

1964 novel by James White

- First US edition
- Author: James White
- Cover artist: Jack Gaughan
- Genre: Science fiction
- Publisher: Ace Books
- Publication date: 1965

The Escape Orbit (British title: Open Prison) is a science fiction novel by northern Irish author James White. It was first published in serial form in 1964 under the name "Open Prison" in the magazine New Worlds. It was nominated for best novel in the 1965 Nebula Awards.

It tells the story of a human, Warren, who is abandoned on a prison planet by an alien race, the Bugs, who are warring against Earth. Here he finds a society created by the other human prisoners. To avoid a civil war between the factions which have formed by the years, he organizes a successful escape from the planet.
