= Major Operation =

First edition, published by Ballantine Books. Cover art by Dean Ellis.

Major Operation is a 1971 science fiction book by Northern Irish author James White, the third volume in the Sector General series. The book collects together a series of five short stories, all of which were originally published in New Worlds magazine.

== Stories ==
- "Invader" – A series of clumsy accidents at the hospital lead Conway to suspect an alien presence.
- "Vertigo" (1968) – a spinning ship (from the planet later nicknamed 'Meatball') is 'rescued' and brought to the hospital.
- "Blood Brother" (1969) – Meatball's natural doctors are discovered.
- "Meatball (1966) – Additional investigation reveals more about Meatball's doctors.
- "Major Operation (1971) – A gigantic patient on Meatball fights medical treatment.
