= C.S. Unnikrishnan =

Indian physicist and professor (born 1962)

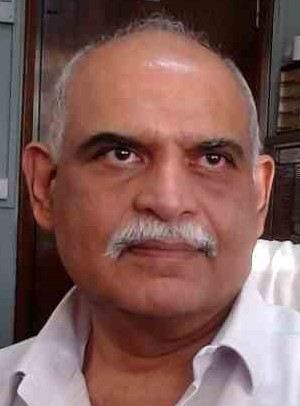
- Unnikrishnan in 2023
- Born: 25 July 1962 (age 64); Kalady, Keralam, India
- Education: Indian Institute of Technology, Madras; Tata Institute of Fundamental Research; University of Mumbai
- Occupations: Professor, Tata Institute of Fundamental Research, India; Professor, Defence Institute of Advanced Technology, India; Adjunct Professor, Indian Institute of Astrophysics, India;
- Parent: C.K. Sivarama Pillai: G.Kalyanikutty Amma
- Awards: Breakthrough Prize in Physics (2016); Gruber Prize in Cosmology (2016)

C. S. Unnikrishnan (born 25 July 1962) is an Indian physicist and professor known for his contributions in multiple areas of experimental and theoretical physics. He has been a professor at the Tata Institute of Fundamental Research Mumbai and is currently a professor in the School of Quantum Technology at the Defence Institute of Advanced Technology in Pune. He has made significant contributions in foundational issues in gravity and quantum physics and has published over 250 research papers and articles. Unnikrishnan is also a key member of the LIGO-India project and a member of the global LIGO Scientific Collaboration

== Education ==
Unnikrishnan received his M.Sc. degree from Indian Institute of Technology, Madras and his Ph.D. from the Tata Institute of Fundamental Research, University of Mumbai. He has also been a visiting researcher at the Kastler-Brossel Laboratory of the Ecole Normale Supérieure in Paris and at the University of Paris 13.

== Research contributions ==
Unnikrishnan is a renowned researcher in the field of foundational issues in gravity and quantum physics, including quantum optics. His expertise lies in experimental physics, and he has been instrumental in setting up the laser-cooling laboratory at TIFR, Mumbai. He is well-versed in the use of torsion balances, interferometers, laser cooled atoms, and Bose-Einstein Condensates for his experiments.

Unnikrishnan's major theoretical contributions include the Theory of Cosmic Relativity and Universal Action Mechanics. These theories have provided new insights into our understanding of the interplay between gravity and quantum mechanics, and have opened up new avenues for further research. Cosmic Relativity, replaces current theories of dynamics and relativity and argues that all relativistic phenomena and laws of dynamics are controlled by the gravitational potentials of matter and energy in the universe. It provides evidence and solutions to several major issues in fundamental physics.

The discovery of the quantization of the Hall effect, where the movement of electrons is restricted to a 2-D plane, was characterized by quantized plateaus in the Hall resistance and has a simple theory for the integer quantum Hall effect, but there is still no proper understanding of the more spectacular fractional quantum Hall effect. The Cosmic Relativity theory offers a comprehensive understanding of both integer and fractional effects by modifying the quantum degeneracy due to cosmic gravitomagnetic interaction.

== Professional accomplishments ==
Awards

- Breakthrough Prize in Physics (2016)
- Gruber Prize in Cosmology (2016)

Unnikrishnan is a key member and proposer-scientist of the LIGO-India project and has been a member of the LIGO Scientific Collaboration (LSC). He has made a significant impact in the field of gravitational waves as he shared the Breakthrough Prize in Physics and the Gruber Prize in Cosmology with the LSC in 2016 for their groundbreaking discovery.

He has held academic positions at the Tata Institute of Fundamental Research (TIFR) Mumbai, India, School of Quantum Technology at the Defence Institute of Advanced Technology (DIAT) Pune, India and Indian Institute of Astrophysics (IIA), Bangalore, India.

Unnikrishnan has published over 250 research papers and articles, and is also the author of two major works: his first monograph "Gravity's Time" and a major treatise "New Relativity in the Gravitational Universe". The treatise, which presents a new and innovative perspective on the foundational basis of relativity, has had a major impact in the field. The latter book calls for a change in the foundational basis of relativity and provides a solution to outstanding questions and puzzles about dynamics and relativity.

== Books authored ==
- Gravity's Time
- New Relativity in the Gravitational Universe
