= The Silent Stars Go By (White novel) =

1991 novel by James White

- First Edition
- Author: James White
- Cover artist: Vincent Di Fate
- Language: English
- Genre: Science fiction
- Publisher: Del Rey Books
- Publication date: September 1991
- Media type: Print (Paperback)
- Pages: 441
- ISBN: 0-345-37110-0

The Silent Stars Go By is a 1991 science fiction book by author James White.

== Citations ==
http://www.sectorgeneral.com/books/silentstarsgoby.html
