= Spacehounds of IPC =

1931 novel by Edward Elmer Smith

- Dust-jacket from the first edition
- Author: Edward E. Smith, Ph.D.
- Illustrator: A. J. Donnell
- Cover artist: A. J. Donnell
- Language: English
- Genre: Science fiction
- Publisher: Fantasy Press
- Publication date: 1947
- Publication place: United States
- Media type: Print (Hardback)
- Pages: 257
- OCLC: 1234601

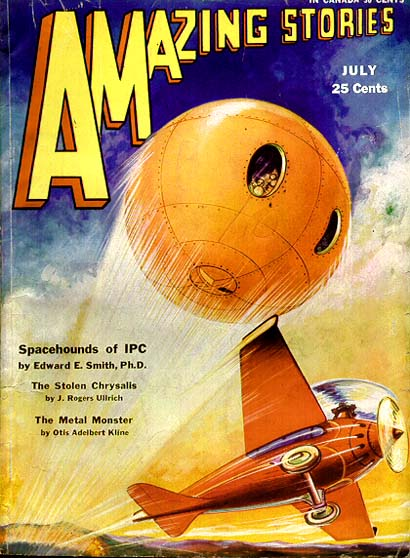
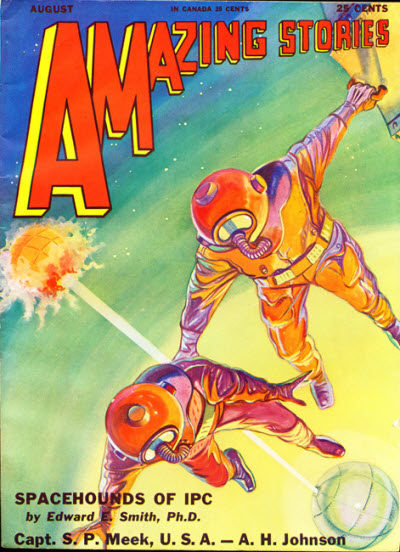
The first two installments of the Spacehounds serialization were cover-featured on Amazing Stories, illustrated by Leo Morey

Spacehounds of IPC is a science fiction novel by American writer E. E. Smith. It was first published in book form in 1947 by Fantasy Press in an edition of 2,008 copies. It was the first book published by Fantasy Press. The novel was originally serialized in the August, September and October issues of the magazine Amazing Stories in 1931. Smith was disenchanted when he saw editor T. O'Conor Sloane's unauthorized changes in the story, most likely made to give equal length to each of the three parts it had been split into.

The story was the first to use the term "tractor beam", a name and concept that has been adopted by many subsequent literary works of fiction and other media to the present day.

== Plot synopsis ==
The Inter-Planetary Corporation's (IPC) space-liner, IPV Arcturus, takes off on a routine flight to Mars. Brilliant physicist Dr. Percival (“Steve”) Stevens is aboard to validate the work of the ship's pilots in response to reports by the Check Stations of errors in the ship's flight positions. To his relief, he confirms that the pilots are right, and it was the Check Stations that were out of position, not the ships.

Before the Arcturus can reach Mars it is attacked and literally cut into pieces by a small, mysterious, globe-shaped spaceship. The attacking spaceship begins towing the pieces toward Jupiter. Stevens and a female passenger named Nadia Newton end up stranded in a large, wedge-shaped piece of the dismembered ship. They work to repair as much equipment as they can, gathering needed material from other pieces of the ship floating nearby, and start calling the piece they are in the Forlorn Hope. As they approach Jupiter, Stevens eases the Forlorn Hope out of the pack and manages a hard landing on Ganymede, a moon of Jupiter.

With the remains of the Forlorn Hope, Steve has everything he needs to construct an ultra-radio set capable of reaching the inner worlds and calling for help. But the landing discharged the accumulators, and with no power, they must be recharged before anything else can be done. While Steve uses the ship for raw materials to build a hydro-electric power plant and a power beaming station to recharge the accumulators, Nadia explores the area around where they landed.

She finds Ganymede is Earth-like. She goes out each day to gather plants and animals that they can eat, while Steve struggles to rebuild most of Earth's basic technology from the ground up. He succeeds in building a power plant and recharging the accumulators, and has also completed the ultra-radio except for the high-power output tube, which requires platinum, which they don't have, and must also be sealed in a vacuum. While on a trip away from their base, Steve and Nadia encounter primitive six limbed beings, which they call "Hexans". The Hexans chase them back to the Forlorn Hope, and Steve takes off to avoid being overrun.

Now in space and getting power beamed from the station he built on Ganymede, Steve navigates toward a comet that is in the vicinity of Jupiter at the time, which he remembers contains platinum which he can use for the output tube. Then he can seal the tube in the vacuum of space, and call for help. The comet is heading away from Jupiter, but after a long chase they catch it, and it does have platinum in it. Steve gets the metal he needs and starts building the parts he needs for the tube.

Before he completes the task the Forlorn Hope is attacked by a ship similar to the one that cut up the Arcturus and started their adventure. As the enemy ship begins cutting up the Forlorn Hope, another small globular ship arrives, but this one has a mirrored surface instead of a dull one like the attacking ship. The attacking ship immediately turns its weapon on the newcomer, but the mirror surface reflects the beam. The mirrored ship fires back with homing missiles and destroys the enemy ship.

The people manning the mirror ship are a strange type of humanoid: very tall, with barrel chests, and pale blue in color. They are from Saturn's moon Titan, and were exploring inward from their home and have no idea why the other ship attacked them on sight. Since Titan is so cold, the Titanians use ice as a building material and think of liquid water as "molten ice". Their blood is a mixture of substances that don't freeze even at Titan's temperature, and so combustable that if they were to stand unprotected next to an Earth human they would literally burst into flame.

The ship from Titan has taken damage in the fight and must head for home. The Forlorn Hope is in pieces and at the end of its power beam, so the commander of the Titanian ship offers to tow the pieces back to Titan and help the people from Earth rebuild their ship and get back to the Jupiter system. Steve and Nadia gladly accept, doing what repairs they can on the Forlorn Hope, and continuing to build the power tube on the long voyage to Titan.

Upon arriving on Titan they find that one of the Titanian power plants, which have been built with great difficulty on the surface of Saturn, has failed, and lack of power has endangered their world. Due to the heat and gravity, it would cost many Titanian lives to return to Saturn and repair the power plant, so being better able to survive heat, Steve volunteers to do the work. He succeeds, and with the help of the Titanians, the repaired and upgraded Forlorn Hope heads back to Ganymede.

When they are nearing Jupiter again, they are attacked by six of the enemy spaceships. The enemy ships move in close and start beaming the Forlorn Hope, but the ship has been coated with the mirror substance and loaded with homing missiles. Although taking some damage, the Hope destroys all six ships. Steve lands the damaged ship back on Ganymede next to the power plant. With the radio complete and all the power he needs, Steve sends out an "S.O.S."

Soon, the IPV Sirius, an armed scientific vessel with two of Steve's scientist friends aboard, is on the way, Steve sends them all the information he has on the weapons of the enemy ships and of the Titanians, so the scientists can work on finding defenses against them and making improvements to them. Upon arrival at Ganymede to rescue the castaways, the Sirius has a chance to try out her new weapons and defenses when they are attacked by an enemy globe. With their own weapons, and the improved weapons of the enemy, they destroy the enemy globe and pick up Steve and Nadia.

The story moves to the rest of the wreckage of the Arcturus, and the surviving passengers and crew. As the globe ship towing them nears Jupiter, it is attacked by a human ship from the moon Callisto and destroyed, and the passengers and crew are rescued. They are told by the Callistonians that the Jupiter system is in the final stages of a war between the Hexans and the humans of Jupiter's moons. The four major moons have all produced both Hexan and human species and they have battled from their first meeting. The war has been going on for ages and a few underground cities on Callisto and Europa are all that remain of the losing human populations of the moons. The men of the inner planets and the men of the Jupiter system join forces, and with the now superior weapons and defenses available to both sides they start taking back the moons from the Hexans.

During the war, the human's minor involvement is seen in a war between the Hexans and Vorkulians on the surface of Jupiter. The Vorkulians are a species completely unlike either Hexans or Humans. The story ends with the rebuilt Arcturus arriving on Mars only four hundred forty-six days, fifteen hours, eleven minutes, thirty-eight and seven-tenths seconds late.

== Reception ==
Astounding reviewer P. Schuyler Miller declared Spacehounds to be his favorite among Smith's writings, describing it as "the most believable of all Smith's books ... show[ing] considerably greater expertness in writing than its author's previous novels." E. F. Bleiler wrote that, despite the novel's one-time popularity, "The combination of a considerable amount of advanced scientific double-talk, women's magazine romance, and space battles does not succeed."

== Sources ==
- Chalker, Jack L.; Mark Owings (1998). The Science-Fantasy Publishers: A Bibliographic History, 1923-1998. Westminster, MD and Baltimore: Mirage Press, Ltd. p. 235.
- Tuck, Donald H. (1978). The Encyclopedia of Science Fiction and Fantasy. Chicago: Advent. p. 398. ISBN 0-911682-22-8.
