= Sector General =

Short stories and novels by James White

The original cover of Hospital Station, the first book in the series

Sector General is a series of twelve science fiction novels and various short stories (1957–1999) by the Northern Irish author James White. The series derives its name from the setting of the majority of the books, the Sector 12 General Hospital, a large hospital space station located in deep space, designed to treat a wide variety of life forms with a wide range of ailments and life-support requirements, and to house an equally diverse staff. The Hospital was founded to promote peace after humanity's first interstellar war, and in the fourth book the authorities conclude that its emergency services are the most effective way to make peaceful contact with new species.

In order to treat patients of other species, doctors must download into their brains "educator tapes" containing the necessary medical knowledge, and these tapes also transmit the personalities of their donors. As a result, doctors have to struggle with the tastes imported from their donors, ranging from a dislike of their own species' normal food to sexual attraction for members of the donor's species. Other running gags include the acerbic tongue of the Chief Psychologist and one very senior non-human doctor's love of gossip, especially about the sexual behavior of other species.

The series is noted for its diverse and believable non-humanoid alien life forms, and for its pacifist philosophy. White chose the hospital setting as a way to generate dramatic tension without violence, and because in his youth he wanted to be a doctor but had to go to work.

== Background ==
Sector General is a gigantic multi-species hospital space station founded as a peace-promoting project by two heroes from opposite sides of humanity's first full interstellar war. The hospital accommodates patients and staff from dozens of species, with different environmental requirements, behaviors and ailments, but many of the stories feature types of patient that the builders did not anticipate. Initially most of the stories center round the career of Doctor Conway, who rises from junior surgeon to the top level, Senior Diagnostician. In the fourth book the Galactic Federation decides that the emergency service which the hospital offers to victims of space accidents and planetary catastrophes is its most effective means of making peaceful contact with new spacefaring species, which allows the series to expand its range of plots, characters and locations.

White said that The Troubles in Northern Ireland induced him to write about the sort of world he would like to live in, and that he disliked war and militarists. As a youth he wanted to become a doctor, but had to go out to work. Hence he relied on epidemics and natural disasters to provide the conflicts that stories need to make them interesting. He credited his wife, who was an intensive care nurse at the height of The Troubles, for advice on medical details and for pointing out how padres often did more good than doctors for disturbed patients, which inspired The Genocidal Healer.

The hospital uses a four-letter system to assign patients to wards that provide suitable environments, a classification technique used earlier by E. E. "Doc" Smith's Children of the Lens. White's Star Healer introduces the classification "FOKT", which is regarded as an in-joke on the name of the Glasgow science fiction club Friends of Kilgore Trout.

== Challenges of inter-species medicine ==
Sector General was founded to promote inter-species harmony, and therefore all medical staff must be prepared to treat beings with very different physiologies and behavior patterns, and sometimes with environmental requirements that would be lethal to staff without suitable protection.

Diseases are species specific, so there is no danger of a disease or virus spreading to other races and potentially causing a pandemic. Extreme care is still taken, as there only has to be single instance of this not being the case to have deadly consequences.

When necessary physicians, surgeons and pathologists download information about patients' species into their minds from "Educator tapes", recordings of the memories of great practitioners in the appropriate species. However, in addition to medical knowledge, the educator tapes also capture the personalities of the medical experts who recorded them. Thus having an educator tape active threatens the recipient with multiple personality disorder. The new personality is from a vastly different species, often with very different behavior codes and sexual preferences, and, to make matters worse, the donors were often very dominant personalities. The mildest symptom of such conflicts is a running gag in which users of these tapes are often seen in the Sector General's cafeteria, eating a bland-looking sandwich with closed eyes. On the other hand, the risk of finding members of other species sexually attractive is a serious concern.

Junior doctors usually have these acquired memories erased as soon as possible.

== Regular characters ==
Human characters are specifically referred to as Earth-humans, as every species refers to themselves as "human" when translated. Alternatively, humans are also termed DBDGs, referring to their biological classification, which they share with the Etlans. In each story characters belonging to a species different from that of the protagonist are treated as neuter and referred to as "it". Some species are sensitive to any references to sexual roles and behavior, some have more than two sexes and some change sex once or more during their lifetimes.

The following characters appear in nearly all the stories:

- Dr. Conway: a male Earth-human who starts as a junior intern and, over the course of the series, works his way up to Chief Surgeon and eventually Diagnostician in Charge of Surgery.
- Murchison: a female Earth-human first seen as a senior nurse in the Pathology department.
- Dr. Prilicla: a large but fragile winged insect-like being from the very low-gravity planet Cinruss. In addition to being highly skilled in the more delicate types of surgery, Prilicla is an empath and therefore can sense the emotions of most other lifeforms including many non-intelligent animals.
- Major O'Mara: the Earth-human head of the hospital's Psychology department, his job is to ensure that the hospital's diverse species work together as harmoniously, efficiently and safely as circumstances allow.
- Charge Nurse Naydrad: a member of the Kelgian species. The species is incapable of both lying and tact. Naydrad is a specialist in rescuing victims of space accidents.
- Thornnastor: a native of the high-gravity planet Traltha, Thornnastor (nicknamed "Thorny") has a body like a six-legged elephant, and its own keen senses are supplemented by a symbiont that provides acute vision up to 360 degrees. Thornnastor is the Diagnostician in Charge of Pathology, and it carries ten Educator tapes. Its fascination with gossip, especially about the scandalous activities of a multi-sexed, methane-breathing, cryogenic species, is a running gag in the series.

== Critical appraisal ==
The Sector General series defined the subgenre of multi-species medical stories, although L. Ron Hubbard's Ole Doc Methuselah stories and Murray Leinster's Med Service stories, neither of which were highly regarded, had explored some similar themes. Sector General was "the first explicitly pacifist space opera" series, while much of contemporary space opera from the USA was notably military. Mike Resnick described the series' characters as "the most memorable crew of aliens ever created". Michael Ashley commented that the setting of the television series Star Trek: Deep Space Nine is reminiscent of Sector General. The Babylon 5 television series was also set in space station with atmospheres for different species.

Many commentators attribute the series' popularity to the altruism of its doctors and the emphasis on seeking to build peaceful relations between different species. John Clute wrote that "in the depiction of goodness may lie the real genius of James White." White's hatred of war and xenophobia is a constant theme of the series, notably in: Star Surgeon, where the Monitor Corps fights a savage battle in defence of the hospital space station, to prevent the conflict from escalating into a full interstellar war that can only end in genocide; and in The Genocidal Healer, where an alien race's sexual urges are almost eliminated by a plague and can only be stimulated by hand-to-hand combat.

The early stories focus almost entirely on medical problems, mainly from Conway's viewpoint. In Dave Langford's opinion the xenobiological novelties were becoming less credible by the end of Star Healer, and using a variety of alien viewpoint characters gave the later books "considerable new pep". These also deal with deeper issues, notably in The Genocidal Healer, and better than most science fiction according to Resnick.

Opinions differ about the quality of the series as a whole. For example, Gary Westfahl wrote that "the Sector General stories remained consistently fresh and involving, and they grew in prominence as the series progressed." On the other hand, Todd White wrote that the series declined after Star Healer (1985), hitting a low point with The Galactic Gourmet (1996), and that the later books tended to stretch a short story's worth of content to the length of a novel. However he thought that Mind Changer (1998) represented an improvement.

Publishers Weekly described Mind Changer as "White's finest performance, replete with wit, originality, medical expertise and sheer decency" and commented that the series shows no signs of aging, and Booklist described the book as an "enjoyable, witty resumé" of Chief Psychologist O'Mara's career.

Clinton Lawrence described the last Sector General book, Double Contact (1999), as "in a very positive way, a throwback to an earlier era in science fiction" since it is optimistic and depicts several advanced species working harmoniously. The struggle to build trust and produce a successful first contact is, he thought, as exciting and suspenseful as one could wish for. However he noted that the level of characterization was the minimum required to support the plot.

== Stories in the series ==
The Sector General series began as short stories published in New Worlds from 1957 onwards. Originally White intended to end the series with Star Healer (1985), by which time the central characters had reached the top levels in their careers, but Ballantine Books persuaded him to continue. He extended the stories' range by introducing new central characters beginning with Code Blue - Emergency (1987), and The Genocidal Healer (1992) focused on psychological and theological issues of guilt and forgiveness rather than strictly medical ones.

The books in the series are:

- Hospital Station (1962: stories published in New Worlds 1957–1960)
- Star Surgeon (1963)
- Major Operation (1971: stories published in New Worlds 1968–1971)
- Ambulance Ship (1979)
- Sector General (1983)
- Star Healer (1985)
- Code Blue - Emergency (1987)
- The Genocidal Healer (1992)
- The Galactic Gourmet (1996)
- Final Diagnosis (1997)
- Mind Changer (1998)
- Double Contact (1999)

These were also published as omnibus editions:

- Beginning Operations (2001) contains Hospital Station, Star Surgeon and Major Operation.
- Alien Emergencies (2002) contains Ambulance Ship, Sector General and Star Healer.
- General Practice (2003) contains Code Blue - Emergency and The Genocidal Healer.
- Tales of Sector General (1999) contains The Galactic Gourmet, Final Diagnosis, and Mind Changer.

=== Short stories ===
- White's short story "Sector General" is included in the book Hospital Station.
- In addition to these books, several related short stories ("Countercharm", "Tableau", "Occupation: Warrior", and "Custom Fitting") appear in other collections by White. The first three appear in The Aliens Among Us, the fourth in Futures Past.
- The short story "Custom Fitting" does not mention Sector General, but does describe the Galactic Federation making its first contact with Earth. "Tableau" also does not mention Sector General but introduces the alien race of the Orligians, who appear in the series.
- The short story "Occupation: Warrior", published in 1959, provides the backstory of the Monitor Corps' Commander Dermod, who appears in some of the books. However the editor of Science Fiction Adventures removed all reference to Sector General from "Occupation: Warrior" because he thought it was too grim to be treated as part of the series. "Countercharm" is the only short story actually set in Sector General not included in a Sector General book.

== Similar works ==
The Second Best Hospital in the Galaxy is unrelated, but uses a similar hospital-in-space setting.
