= Starchild (novel) =

1965 science fiction novel by Frederick Pohl and Jack Williamson

Cover of one of the episodes serialized in the magazine If in 1964.

Starchild is a dystopian science fiction novel by American writers Frederik Pohl and Jack Williamson, published in 1965. It is part of the Starchild Trilogy, a series of three books, the others being The Reefs of Space (1964) and Rogue Star (1969). Starchild is about a rebellion against the government-computer by a mysterious person or group called the "Starchild".

== Plot ==
The novel is set in a dystopian future on an Earth where mankind is ruled by a brutal totalitarian government known as the Plan of Man, enforced by a computerized surveillance state. In The Reefs of Space, the main character is a genius scientist, Steve Ryeland, who is trying to build a new type of rocket drive. In Starchild there is an unknown person or group called "Starchild" who stands up to the "Plan of Man" computer. The "Starchild" leads a bloody campaign against the computer and sabotages "Plan of Man" technologies. Another mystery is how a "Plan of Man" agent named Boysie Gann can travel across space in a flash. The reader learns more about the Reefs of Space, areas which have only a few habitable zones. When refugees from the "Plan of Man" state try to escape to the Reefs of Space, the "Plan of Man" tries to blockade the Reefs, but this is not effective.

== Reception ==
James Nicoll states that the strategy of the Starchild is strange, as "it seems to be designed to maximize drama and body count rather than to accomplish its goal [of freeing people from totalitarianism] effectively." Nicoll praises the authors' explanation of the illusions of the complex Reef ecosystems.
