= Rogue Star (novel) =

1969 science fiction novel by Frederick Pohl and Jack Williamson

Cover of the first edition (published by Ballantine Books. Cover art by Paul Lehr.

Rogue Star is a dystopian science fiction novel by American writers Frederik Pohl and Jack Williamson, published in 1969. It is part of the Starchild Trilogy, a series of three books, in which (in the first two) mankind is ruled by a brutal totalitarian government known as the Plan of Man, enforced by a computerized surveillance state (these books are The Reefs of Space (1964) and Starchild (1965)). In Rogue Star, the totalitarian state is replaced by a utopian state, but the characters are threatened by a mysterious force.

== Plot ==
In The Reefs of Space, the main character, Steve Ryeland, is a genius scientist trying to build a new type of rocket drive. In Starchild there is an unknown person or group called "Starchild" who stands up to the "Plan of Man" computer, leading a bloody rebellion.

In Rogue Star, the "Plan of Man" computer's totalitarian domination is ended when humans meet advanced "civilizations and godlike beings" from nearby galaxies who have created utopian societies. Nevertheless, Andreas Quamodian is still unhappy in his home on Exion Four, even though it is a model society. He gets a strained message from an old girlfriend on Earth, Molly Zaldivar. When he teleports to get to her, he is abducted by a rogue star. On Earth, Molly's inventor boyfriend Cliff Hawk is examining rogue stars and tries to "play God" by creating one in his laboratory.

== Reception ==
James Nicoll criticizes the writers' development of the protagonist, saying Andreas Quamodian "...belongs to that select group of protagonists who could have stayed home and read the paper without much reducing their effect on the outcome of the plot"; as well, he says even Molly is "...only as a hostage and the object of a stalker’s obsession." Nicoll says the world-building of the authors is more interesting than the story; however, he says that even this well-designed world is not given much exposure in the book.
