= Star Healer =

1985 novel by James White

First edition, published by Del Rey Books. Cover art by Rick Sternbach.

Star Healer is a 1985 science fiction book by author James White, part of the Sector General series.

== Plot ==
Conway is replaced on the ambulance ship Rhabwar by Prilicla, with the intend to make Conway a Diagnostician. Conway visits healer Khone on the planet Goglesk, and witnesses first-hand their destructive racial mass-hysteria response to physical proximity. He inadvertently links minds with Khone and learns a great deal more. Back at Hospital Station, Conway decides to treat some Hudlar accident victims with a rear-to-front limb transplant, because stranger transplants require permanent exile. Conway also proposes staving off geriatric Hudlar problems by elective amputation. At the end, he successfully delivers a sentient telepathic Unborn (seen in the other novel of the series Ambulance Ship) from its violent non-sentient Protector.
