= The Reefs of Space =

1964 science fiction novel by Frederick Pohl and Jack Williamson

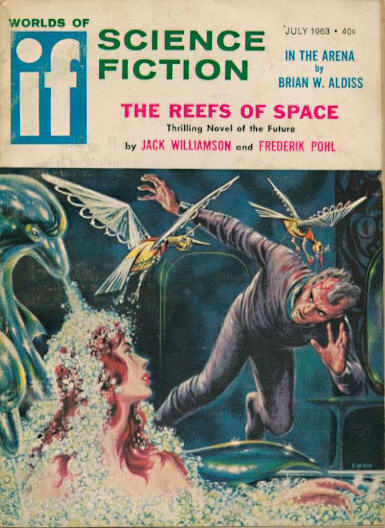
The Reefs of Space was serialized in If in 1963

The Reefs of Space is a dystopian science fiction novel by American writers Frederik Pohl and Jack Williamson, published in 1964. It is part of the Starchild Trilogy, the other books in the series being Starchild (1965) and Rogue Star (1969).

== Plot ==
The novel is set in a dystopian future where mankind is ruled by a brutal totalitarian government known as the Plan of Man, enforced by a computerized surveillance state. The main character is a genius scientist, Steve Ryeland, who is trying to build a new type of rocket drive. While Ryeland is struggling with amnesia, he has a computer companion named Oporto. Due to Ryeland's anti-government actions in the past, the Plan of Man Computer deems him to be a security risk, so he is forced to wear a bomb-equipped collar, which he is hoping to be able to remove.

== Reception ==
Joachim Boaz's review in Science Fiction and Other Suspect Ruminations calls it "an enjoyable read" and he praises the "quick prose", action, and dialogue that keeps the reader interested.
