= James White (author) =

Northern Irish science fiction author (1928–1999)

- Born: 7 April 1928; Belfast, Northern Ireland
- Died: 23 August 1999 (aged 71); Portstewart, Northern Ireland
- Occupation: Author
- Spouse: Margaret "Peggy" Sarah Martin (m. 1955)
- Children: 3
- Writing career
- Genre: Science fiction
- Notable works: Sector General series; Second Ending; The Escape Orbit, also titled Open Prison
- Website: sectorgeneral.com

James White (7 April 1928 – 23 August 1999) was a Northern Irish author of science fiction. He was born in Belfast and returned there after spending some early years in Canada. After a few years working in the clothing industry, he worked at Short Brothers Ltd., an aircraft company based in Belfast, from 1965 until taking early retirement in 1984 as a result of diabetes. White married Margaret Sarah Martin, another science fiction fan, in 1955 and the couple had three children. He died of a stroke.

He became a fan of science fiction in 1941 and co-wrote two fan magazines, from 1948 to 1953 and 1952 to 1965. Encouraged by other fans, White began publishing short stories in 1953, and his first novel was published in 1957. His best-known novels were the twelve of the Sector General series, the first published in 1962 and the last after his death. White also published nine other novels, two of which were nominated for major awards, unsuccessfully.

White abhorred violence, and medical and other emergencies were the sources of dramatic tension in his stories. The "Sector General" series is regarded as defining the genre of medical science fiction, and as introducing a memorable crew of aliens. Although missing winning the most prestigious honours four times, White gained other awards for specific works and for contributions to science fiction. He was also Guest-of-Honour of several conventions.

== Biography ==
James White was born to a Catholic family in Belfast, Northern Ireland, on 7 April 1928, and spent part of his early life in Canada. He was educated in Belfast at St. John's Primary School (1935–1941) and St. Joseph's Technical Secondary School (1942–1943). As a teenager he lived with foster parents. He wanted to study medicine but financial circumstances prevented this. Between 1943 and 1965 he worked for several Belfast tailoring firms and then as assistant manager of a Co-op department store. He married Margaret ("Peggy") Sarah Martin, another science fiction fan, in 1955 and the couple had three children: daughter Patricia, and sons Martin and Peter. White later worked for the aeroplane builders Short Brothers Ltd. as a technical clerk (1965–1966), publicity assistant (1966–1968), and publicity officer (1968–1984).

He became a science fiction fan in 1941, attracted particularly by the works of E. E. "Doc" Smith, which featured good aliens as well as evil ones, and of Robert A. Heinlein, many of whose stories concern ordinary people. In 1947 he met another Irish fan, Walter A. ("Walt") Willis, and the two helped to produce the fan magazines Slant (1948–1953) and Hyphen (1952–1965), which featured stories and articles by authors including John Brunner, A. Bertram Chandler, and Bob Shaw. In 2004 both White and Willis were nominated for the retrospective Hugo Award for Best Fan Writer of 1953, although neither won. White said that he started writing stories because the Slant team felt that Astounding Science Fiction was too dominated by prophecies of nuclear doom, and his friends dared him to write the kind of story that they all liked to read. He said that getting published was fairly easy during the 1950s, as the World War II restrictions on paper were ended, and there were at least 12 science magazines in Britain and about 40 in the United States. His first published short story, "Assisted Passage", a parody of 1950s Anglo-Australian emigration policies, appeared in the January 1953 edition of the magazine New Worlds. Further stories appeared in New Worlds during the next few years, but White's attempt to access the more lucrative American market by submitting stories to Astounding Science Fiction stalled after the publication of "The Scavengers". White later said that his optimism about inter-species relations was unpalatable to Astounding's xenophobic editor, John W. Campbell. As a result, White's work was little-known outside the UK until the 1960s.

In 1957, Ace Books published White's first novel, The Secret Visitors, which included locations in Northern Ireland. The book had previously been serialised in New Worlds with the title Tourist Planet. Ace Books' science fiction editor, Donald A. Wollheim, thought the original ending was too tame and suggested that White should insert an all-out space battle just after the climactic courtroom scene. In November the same year New Worlds published White's novelette '"Sector General", and editor John ("Ted") Carnell requested more stories set in the same universe, founding the series for which White is known best. White gained "a steady following" for his "scientifically accurate" stories, which were examples of hard science fiction in New Worlds, despite the magazine's promotion of literary "New Wave" science fiction during the 1960s.

White kept his job with Short Brothers and wrote in the evenings, as his stories did not make enough money for him to become a full-time author. In 1980 he taught a literature course at a Belfast branch of the Workers Educational Association. When diabetes had severely impaired his eyesight, he took early retirement in 1984 and relocated to the north Antrim resort town of Portstewart, where he continued to write. For many years he was a Council Member of the British Science Fiction Association and, with Harry Harrison and Anne McCaffrey, a Patron of the Irish Science Fiction Association. White was also a strong pacifist. He died of a stroke on 23 August 1999, while his novels Double Contact and The First Protector were being prepared for publication. His wife Peggy, son Martin, and daughter Patricia survived him.

== Published works ==
=== Sector General ===
The Sector General series consists of 12 books published originally between 1962 (Hospital Station) and 1999 (Double Contact). Additional short stories set in the Sector General Universe ('"Countercharm", "Tableau", "Occupation: Warrior", and "Custom Fitting") appear in other collections by White.

Sector General is a gigantic multi-species hospital space station founded as a peace-making project by two heroes from opposite sides of humanity's only full interstellar war. The hospital accommodates patients and staff from dozens of species, with different environmental requirements, behaviours and ailments. Initially most of the stories concern the career of Doctor Conway, who rises from junior surgeon to Diagnostician. In the fourth book the Galactic Federation decides that the emergency service which the hospital offers to victims of space accidents and planetary catastrophes is the most effective means of making peaceful contact with new spacefaring species, which allows the series to expand its range of plots, characters and settings. The seventh and later books each have a different and usually alien viewpoint character, which gave them "considerable new pep". They also expand the range of issues beyond purely medical, and in Mike Resnick's opinion treat issues such as guilt and forgiveness better than most science fiction.

The series defined the subgenre of multi-species medical stories, and was "the first explicitly pacifist space opera" series, when much of contemporary space opera from the United States was notably military.

=== Other novels ===
Second Ending (1961), which White described as "about the last man on Earth" but with "an upbeat ending", was short-listed for a Hugo Award.

The Escape Orbit (1964; titled Open Prison in the UK), which was short-listed for a Nebula Award, chronicles the efforts of human prisoners of war to survive after being dumped on a hostile planet without tools or weapons.

All Judgement Fled (1968), which won the 1972 Europa Award, was described by Mike Resnick as his favourite among White's novels and as "Rendezvous with Rama done right."

White's other novels not part of the Sector General series are:

- The Secret Visitors (1957)
- The Watch Below (1966)
- Tomorrow is Too Far (1971)
- Dark Inferno (1972) (alternate title: Lifeboat)
- The Dream Millennium (1974)
- Underkill (1979)
- Federation World (1988)
- The Silent Stars Go By (1991)
- Earth:Final Conflict:First Protector (1999)

=== Collections and short stories ===
The title story of White's collection Deadly Litter (1964) anticipated the dangers of space debris although there had been only a few orbital missions. The White Papers was produced by NESFA (New England Science Fiction Association) to commemorate White's being the Guest-of-Honour at the 1996 Worldcon, and includes short stories and fan magazine articles by White, plus sections of Gary Louie's guide to the Sector General series. Among the stories, "Custom Fitting" (1976) was short-listed for a Hugo Award, and "Sanctuary" (1988) won an Analog Analytical Laboratory Award. His short story "Un-Birthday Boy", published in the magazine Analog in 1996 but not in a collection or anthology, was short-listed for a Hugo Award.

Other collections include:

- The Aliens Among Us (1969)
- Monsters and Medics (1977; published by Ballantine Books; includes the novel Second Ending)
- Futures Past (1982) (includes the Sector General story "Spacebird")

== Critical appraisal ==
Paul Kincaid described White as a second-rank writer who occasionally produced first-rank works, and attracted a devoted but not wide audience. Kincaid noted that his plots were often formulaic and his writing employed a predictable set of techniques and mannerisms, along with a "studied quietness." On the other hand, John Clute wrote that "in the depiction of goodness may lie the real genius of James White," Mike Resnick described the Sector General series' characters as "the most memorable crew of aliens ever created," and Graham Andrews wrote that White's aliens are really alien, not just human minds with exotic biologies. Michael Ashley commented that the setting of the television series Star Trek: Deep Space Nine is reminiscent of Sector General, and Mark R. Leeper noted similarities between Sector General's setting and that of television's Babylon 5. Chris Aylott wrote that White's plot construction and writing, including occasionally clumsy exposition, are typical of the Golden Age of science fiction in the 1930s, '40s, and '50s.

Algis Budrys concluded his review of The Watch Below with "... this is very nice writing when considered simply as prose and as an attempt to involve the reader's emotions." However, when reviewing All Judgment Fled he wrote, "I suspect that he generates so much tension within himself while writing a book that he literally cannot bear to come to grips with crucial scenes."

White said of his approach to producing stories, "Of course, the plot idea must come first – but the characters soon take over," and compared it to using a compass rather than a map. He explained that he was drawn to medical themes by two factors: they offered opportunities for dramatic tension without war; and he had wanted to become a doctor, but had to go to work instead. His avoidance of violent themes is as strong in his non-medical stories as in the Sector General series.

None of White's works won Hugo or Nebula Awards, although four were short-listed. However, he won a Europa Prize in 1979, an Analog Analytical Laboratory Award in 1988 and a Science Fiction Chronicle Reader Award in 1996. In 1998, White received the NESFA (New England Science Fiction Association) Edward E. Smith Memorial Award ("Skylark Award") for contributions to science fiction, named after a story by one of his inspirations, E. E. "Doc" Smith, and appreciated this so much that he donated his complete collection of Slant magazines to NESFA. The next year he was inducted into the European Science Fiction Society's Hall of Fame. White was Guest-of-Honour at many conventions including: the 1971 and 1985 Novacons in the United Kingdom; three Beneluxcons (Belgium, Netherlands and Luxembourg); the 1998 Octocon (Ireland); a Nicon (Northern Ireland); and the 1996 Worldcon.

Since 2000 the James White Award has been presented for the best short story by a non-professional writer. The judges are professional authors and editors, and have included Mike Resnick, Orson Scott Card, Lois McMaster Bujold, Peter F. Hamilton, Christopher Priest and Robert Sheckley.

== See also ==
- List of Northern Irish writers
- Category:Novels by James White (author)
- Category:Short story collections by James White (author)

Preceded by Rafal A. Ziemkiewicz	ESFS award for Best Author; 1999	Succeeded by Ken MacLeod
