= Lee Elias =

British-American comics artist (1920–1998)

- Lee Elias (r.) with Harvey Comics publisher Alfred Harvey in 1947
- Born: Leopold Elias; May 21, 1920 Manchester, England
- Died: April 8, 1998 (aged 77) Indianapolis, Indiana, U.S.
- Areas: Penciller, Inker
- Notable works: Beyond Mars; Black Cat

Lee Elias (May 21, 1920 – April 8, 1998) was a British-American comics artist. He was best known for his work on the Black Cat comic book published by Harvey Comics in the 1940s.

== Biography ==
Emigrating to the United States from Manchester, England, when he was a boy, Elias studied art at the Cooper Union and the Art Students League of New York. He started working in comics in 1943 at Fiction House, where his work included features such as "Captain Wings" in Wing Comics, on which he succeeded Bob Lubbers, as well as the Western hero Firehair.

Lee Elias cover for Showcase #41 (November–December 1962)

After leaving Fiction House in 1946, he worked for several different comics companies, including Timely Comics, Hillman Periodicals, and National/DC where he worked on such characters as the Flash, Tommy Tomorrow, and Black Canary. He drew three issues of All Star Comics in 1947 and co-created the Fiddler and the original Star Sapphire with writer Robert Kanigher in All-Flash #32 (Dec. 1947).

=== Black Cat ===
It was Elias's work on Black Cat, a stuntwoman turned crimefighter, for Harvey Comics, that stood out in this period. The series was praised by comics historian Trina Robbins for its "logical" and "straightforward" approach, in contrast to more fantasy-oriented titles like Wonder Woman. Elias worked both as a penciler and an inker in this series, with an art style largely influenced by artists such as Milton Caniff and Noel Sickles. Elias worked for a period as Caniff's assistant. He used the same style for the comic book version of Terry and the Pirates, Caniff's classic comic strip in the same period. Lee Elias left comic books after the 1954 publication of Fredric Wertham's anti-comics book Seduction of the Innocent, which used four of his Black Cat panels as examples of "depraved" comic art.

=== Beyond Mars ===
Elias' work on comic strips included a two-year stint as an assistant to Al Capp on Li'l Abner. His best known comic strip was Beyond Mars, which ran from 1952 to 1955 and was co-created by Elias and science fiction writer Jack Williamson. The strip was exclusive to the New York Daily News' Sunday paper in the United States but was syndicated in Europe and Australia. It was the last Sunday strip to be color-engraved by hand, according to comic strip historian Rick Marschall.

=== Later career ===
Elias drew the "Green Arrow" backup feature in Adventure Comics and World's Finest Comics from 1959 to 1964. He and writer Bob Haney co-created the supervillain Eclipso in House of Secrets #61 (August 1963). Elias only drew the first two appearances of the character and was succeeded on the feature by Alex Toth. His other work for DC in the 1960s included Cave Carson and Adam Strange. From the mid-1960s to the early 1970s, Elias returned to his native England. In 1972, Elias came back to American comic books, working mainly on DC's various horror titles and secondary Marvel Comics titles including Power Man and The Human Fly. His last major project was The Rook series for Warren Publishing, a black-and-white time travel series which played to his strengths as a Western and science fiction artist. With the cancellation of The Rook in 1982, Elias retired from comics, though he continued teaching at the School of Visual Arts and The Kubert School.

== Bibliography ==
=== DC Comics ===
- Adventure Comics #257–269 (Green Arrow); #439 (Seven Soldiers of Victory) (1959–1975)
- All-Flash #29–32 (1947)
- All-Out War #2 (1979)
- All Star Comics #34–36 (Justice Society of America) (1947)
- Batman Family #15 (Batgirl and Robin) (1977)
- Blitzkrieg #5 (1976)
- Challengers of the Unknown #72 (1970)
- Comic Cavalcade #29 (1948)
- Danger Trail #1 (1950)
- DC Special #23–25 (The Three Musketeers) (1976)
- DC Special Series #13 (1978)
- DC Super Stars #15 (1977)
- Detective Comics #156–157, 163–166 (Robotman) (1950)
- Falling in Love #113, 116, 119–120 (1970–1971)
- Flash Comics #86, 91–93, 97–99 (1947–1948)
- Ghosts #24, 30, 42–44, 46, 49–50, 69–70 (1974–1978)
- Girls' Romances #153, 156 (1970–1971)
- Heart Throbs #125 (1970)
- House of Mystery #86, 95–96, 102, 104–106, 113, 117, 123, 146, 153, 286 (1959–1980)
- House of Secrets #22, 33, 36, 44, 56, 58, 61–62 (1959–1963)
- My Greatest Adventure #27, 29, 34–35, 42, 44, 47, 51, 54, 59, 61, 73, 78 (1959–1963)
- Mystery in Space #92–100, 102 (Adam Strange); #101; #103–110 (Ultra the Multi-Alien) (1964–1966)
- Our Army at War #296, 300 (1976–1977)
- Secret Hearts #151 (1971)
- Secrets of Haunted House #16 (1979)
- Sgt. Rock #303, 308–310 (1977)
- Showcase #41–42, 44, 46–47 (Tommy Tomorrow); #48–49, 52 (Cave Carson) (1962–1964)
- Strange Adventures #168, 170–171, 176, 178, 193–196, 199, 202–203, 212 (1964–1968)
- Tales of the Unexpected #36, 42, 49, 69–70, 72, 89, 91, 102 (1959–1967)
- Teen Titans #15 (1968)
- The Unexpected #105, 136, 140–142, 148, 158, 160–161, 169, 178, 181, 199 (1968–1980)
- The Witching Hour #19, 35–36, 46, 52, 70 (1972–1977)
- World's Finest Comics #100–134, 136, 138, 140 (Green Arrow); #237 (Superman/Batman team-up) (1959–1976)
- Young Romance #165 (1970)

=== Harvey Comics ===
- Black Cat #2–30, 33, 38–39, 43–44, 46–51, 54–56, 63–65 (1946–1963)

=== Marvel Comics ===
- Captain America #257 (1981)
- Daredevil #144 (1977)
- Epic Illustrated #23 (1984)
- Human Fly #1, 3–4, 7, 10–12, 15, 18–19 (1977–1979)
- Invaders Annual #1 (1977)
- Marvel Preview #15, 18 (1978–1979)
- Omega the Unknown #8 (1977)
- Power Man #40–46, Annual #1 (1976–1977)
- Power Man and Iron Fist #54–55 (1978–1979)
- The Spectacular Spider-Man #35 (1979)
- Sub-Mariner Comics #22 (1947)

=== Warren Publishing ===
- Eerie #102–103 (1979)
- The Goblin #1–3 (1982)
- The Rook Magazine #1–6, 8–14 (1979–1982)

Preceded by Jack Kirby	"Green Arrow" feature in Adventure Comics artist 1959–1960	Succeeded by n/a
Preceded by Jack Kirby	"Green Arrow" feature in World's Finest Comics artist 1959–1964	Succeeded by n/a
