= Terraforming in popular culture =

Terraforming is well represented in contemporary literature, usually in the form of science fiction, as well as in popular culture. While many stories involving interstellar travel feature planets already suited to habitation by humans and supporting their own indigenous life, some authors prefer to address the unlikeliness of such a concept by instead detailing the means by which humans have converted inhospitable worlds to ones capable of supporting life through artificial means.

== History of use ==
Author Jack Williamson is credited with inventing and popularizing the term "terraform". In July 1942, under the pseudonym Will Stewart, Williamson published a science fiction novella entitled "Collision Orbit" in Astounding Science-Fiction magazine. The series was later published as two novels, Seetee Shock (1949) and Seetee Ship (1951). American geographer Richard Cathcart successfully lobbied for formal recognition of the verb "to terraform", and it was first included in the fourth edition of the Shorter Oxford English Dictionary in 1993.

The concept of terraforming in popular culture predates Williamson's work; for example, the idea of turning the Moon into a habitable environment with atmosphere was already present in La Journée d'un Parisien au XXI^{e} siècle ("A Day of a Parisian in the 21st Century", 1910) by Octave Béliard. In fact, perhaps predating the concept of terraforming, is that of xenoforming – a process in which aliens change the Earth to suit their own needs, already suggested in the classic The War of the Worlds (1898) of H.G. Wells.

== Literature ==
Date	Title	Author	Planet/Moon	Notes
1910	«La Journée d'un Parisien au XXI^{e} siècle» ("A Day of a Parisian in the 21st Century")	Octave Béliard	Moon	The Moon is gradually given an atmosphere, and vegetation is acclimated to allow colonization and make the Moon into a natural reserve or sanctuary for endangered species.
1927	The Last Judgment	J. B. S. Haldane	Venus	An essay that proposes how life on Earth might end and speculates on the evolution of humanity, space exploration and colonization, and adaptation to new environments. Venus is proposed as a new home.
1930	Last and First Men	Olaf Stapledon	Venus and, millions of years later, Neptune	Following up where Haldane left off, Stapledon's future history provides the first example in fiction in which Venus is modified, after a long and destructive war with the original inhabitants. Stapledon imagines a native Venus that is covered in oceans.
1950	Farmer in the Sky	Robert A. Heinlein	Ganymede	A family emigrates from Earth to the Jovian moon Ganymede, which is being terraformed. Farmer in the Sky is a historically significant novel in relation to terraforming in popular culture, as it was one of the first to take the subject more seriously than simple fantasy, portraying terraforming with scientific and mathematical considerations.
1951	The Sands of Mars	Arthur C. Clarke	Mars	First instance of Martian terraforming. Clarke's fictional methods for terraforming the planet include generating heat by igniting Phobos into a second sun, and growing plants that break down the Martian sands in order to release oxygen.
1952	The Martian Way	Isaac Asimov	Mars	Terraforming of Mars using ice from Saturn's rings.
1954	The Big Rain	Poul Anderson	Venus	Terraforming Venus. Anderson considers the great time scale inherent in planetary engineering and its effects upon society. Later, the title ("big rain") became associated with scientific terraforming models.
1958	The Snows of Ganymede	Poul Anderson	Ganymede	Terraforming of Ganymede
1960	Chirurgien d'une planète	Gérard Klein	Mars	Terraforming Mars.
1961	Second Ending	James White	Fomalhaut IV	The fourth planet of Fomalhaut was secretly terraformed by robots over millions of years
1965	Dune	Frank Herbert	Arrakis	Initiated by the Planetologist Pardot Kynes and continued by his son Liet-Kynes (daughter in the 2021 film adaptation), the Fremen of Arrakis were slowly collecting water and environmental data to terraform the desert planet. Originally, this plan was expected to take several generations, or roughly 500 years. However, once Paul Atreides takes the throne as Padishah Emperor, the process is sped up significantly. By the time of Children of Dune, merely 23 years after Paul Atreides became Emperor, half of the desert had been terraformed, and the process is long complete by the time of God Emperor of Dune, in which the desert only remains in a small personal sanctuary of the God Emperor, completely surrounded by man-made mountains. Given that sandworms are poisoned and killed by water, this process decimated their population and all of them were exterminated by the time of God Emperor of Dune, except for the God Emperor himself. This process is undone after God Emperor of Dune's ending, when the God Emperor dies after he is submerged in water and decomposes into sandtrout, the juvenile stage of sandworms, which likely turned Arrakis into a desert planet in the first place with their water-locking abilities.
1969	Isle of the Dead	Roger Zelazny	Illyria	Francis Sandow is the last surviving human born in the 20th century who becomes a "worldscaper" - a terraformer with godlike powers.
1984	Greening of Mars	James Lovelock; Michael Allaby	Mars	One of the most influential science fiction novels on the actual science of terraforming. The novel explores the formation and evolution of planets, the origin of life, and Earth's biosphere. Spacecraft are illustrated in a realistic manner, and terraforming models in the book foreshadowed future debates regarding the goals of terraforming.
1986–1988	Venus of Dreams; Venus of Shadows	Pamela Sargent	Venus	Terraforming of Venus.
1992–1999	Mars Trilogy	Kim Stanley Robinson	Mars	Three novels (plus one collection of short stories) provide a lengthy description of terraforming Mars spanning centuries. The novels represent contemporary scientific and philosophical developments in the field, and also pay homage to the already existing fictional literature related to Mars.

== Television and film ==
Date	Title	Country	Notes	IMDb
1982, 1984	Star Trek II: The Wrath of Khan and Star Trek III: The Search for Spock	USA	Project Genesis, a device for rapidly terraforming worlds to make them suitable for settlement and food production is introduced. At the end of the film, a Genesis Device is detonated in the Mutara nebula, resulting in the creation of a main sequence star and a habitable planet known as the Genesis Planet. Due to unstable "proto-matter" used in the terraforming process, the planet's evolution is accelerated, leading to the eventual premature destruction of the Genesis Planet. The nine-disc Star Trek: The Motion Picture Collection contains an extra featurette on the "real-science applications of terraforming".	
1990	Total Recall	USA	Aliens have built a terraforming device on Mars, which when turned on, fills the atmosphere with oxygen, allowing humans to live on the surface. Total Recall was one of the first films to portray terraforming on Mars, however it was criticized for its scientific inaccuracy.	

== Games ==
Deformable terrain, as used in e.g. Perimeter and Red Faction, is occasionally called terraforming but is not a form of planetary engineering.

=== Video games: As a game mechanic ===
Date	Title	Genre	Notes
1999	Sid Meier's Alpha Centauri	4X	The player can clear native fungus and build infrastructure as part of colonizing an alien planet. Native life can be treated as allies or as enemies. Regional landscaping includes planting forests, constructing canals or isthmuses, adjusting mountains, and changing sea levels. Making the atmosphere breathable was considered, but not implemented.
2003	Master of Orion III	Spacebound 4X	Redesigned terraforming with more details than in the previous installments. Tracking planetary fertility by region rather than identifying each planet by one dominant biome. According to the manual, terraforming is unstable and will decay if not maintained.
2007	Maelstrom: The Battle for Earth Begins	Real-time strategy, third-person shooter	Units can terraform the land to suit their needs, creating artificial hills and ditches, either barring units from entering or exiting and can also be used in staging a defensive stronghold.
2008	Spore	Multiple	Terraforming (or unterraforming) planets in a matter of seconds in the spacebound sandbox phase. A handful of tools to affect heat and humidity, then introduce life. Planetary landscaping.
2012	Terraform	Turn-based puzzle	Terraforming planets made of hexagonal tiles by using tools and different weather conditions to reach planet-specific goals.
2016	TerraGenesis	Simulation	Terraforming by controlling temperature, atmospheric pressure, oxygen level and the presence of liquid water, building infrastructure facilities and conducting research.
2019	Surviving Mars: Green Planet	City-building, survival	Green Planet downloadable content allows the terraforming of Mars.
2020	Per Aspera	City-building	The player controls an artificial intelligence with the objective of terraforming Mars for human colonization.
2023	Terraformers	City-building	The player builds a colony on Mars, starting underground, mining the planet's crystals before moving the population to the surface.

=== Board games ===
Date	Title	Genre	Notes
2016	Terraforming Mars	1-4 players	"Compete with rival CEOs to make Mars habitable and build your corporate empire." FryxGames, Designer: Jacob Fryxelius, Artists: Isaac Fryxelius and Daniel Fryxelius
