= Beyond the Farthest Star =

Beyond the Farthest Star may refer to:

- Beyond the Farthest Star (novel), a 1942 novel by Edgar Rice Burroughs
- Beyond the Farthest Star (film), a 2015 film directed by Andrew William Librizzi
- "Beyond the Farthest Star" (Star Trek: The Animated Series), a 1973 episode of the animated television series Star Trek

== See also ==
- Farthest Star, a 1975 novel by Frederik Pohl, in collaboration with Jack Williamson
- In extremis (disambiguation)
