= Seetee series =

Science fiction series by Jack Williamson

Seetee Shock
- Dust-jacket from the first edition
- Author: Will Stewart
- Cover artist: Edward R. Collins
- Language: English
- Genre: Science fiction
- Publisher: Simon & Schuster
- Publication date: 1950
- Publication place: United States
- Media type: Print (hardback)
- Pages: 238

Seetee Ship
- Dust-jacket from the first edition
- Author: Will Stewart
- Cover artist: Edd Cartier
- Language: English
- Genre: Science fiction
- Publisher: Gnome Press
- Publication date: 1951
- Publication place: United States
- Media type: Print (hardback)
- Pages: 255

The Seetee series is a golden age science fiction series by the American writer Jack Williamson, under the pseudonym "Will Stewart."

The narrative follows a small group of late-22nd century Asteroid Belt colonists who attempt to harness the titular seetee (a phonetic for "ContraTerrene", an obsolete term for antimatter), both for the advancement of humanity and to secure the Belt's independence from an authoritarian colonial administration.

== Publication history ==
The series' constituent stories were originally published as seven installments in Astounding Science Fiction. Six years after the publication of the first three stories, Williamson revisited the setting with Seetee Shock, a novel serialized in Astounding in early 1949 and released in book form by Simon & Schuster the following year. The second and third stories were subsequently combined into the fix-up Seetee Ship, released in 1951 by Gnome Press in an edition of 4,000 copies. Seetee Ship was reprinted by several publishers, including a Lancer omnibus edition in 1972. ("Collision Orbit" has not been collected in either the Gnome or in any later omnibus edition.)

In 1952, Williamson was invited to create a weekly newspaper comic, Beyond Mars, for which he reused much of the physical setting and technological base of the Seetee series, but not the books' continuity: the strip's lead character was a pastiche of several of the series' protagonists, and its versions of Mars and Venus were home to intelligent alien races. Plots tended toward generic adventures involving space pirates and mad scientists, with no greater-scope allusions to solar-system politics; notably, the stories' repressive High Space Guard was transformed into a benign law-enforcement agency.

The following is a list of all publications in the series:

- "Collision Orbit" (short story, July 1942)
- "Minus Sign" (short story, November 1942)
- "Opposites—React!" (novelette, serialized January–February 1943)
- Seetee Shock (novel, serialized February–April 1949)
- Seetee Ship (novel, 1951; fixup of "Minus Sign" and "Opposites—React!")
- Beyond Mars (comic strip, 1952–1955)

== Setting ==
In the late 22nd century, the Asteroid Belt is home to human colonists known as "asterites", who have made many minor bodies habitable through "paragravity" technology. The Belt nonetheless remains a dangerous environment due to the "contraterrene drift", a scattering of antimatter ranging from dust to sizeable asteroids; it comprises twelve percent of the mass of the Belt, and represents the aftermath of an ancient collision between two Mars-size worlds, an extrasolar planet made of antimatter (nicknamed "the Invader") and the slightly-larger "Adonis", which had once orbited between Mars and Jupiter.

The Belt is administered by the High Space Mandate, a condomininum of the major powers of the Solar System: the (American-dominated) Earth-Moon Union, the Martian Reich, the Jovian Soviet, and the pan-Asian Venusian Empire. The powerful Earth-based Interplanet conglomerate, with a century-old Solar-System-wide monopoly on uranium, is a silent partner, and de facto controls the Earth-Moon Union.

The Mandate, headquartered on the asteroid Pallas, dates from 2171, the conclusion of a decade-long war between Earth and its colonies in which all but the Moon gained independence. The asterites - despite having fought on the colonial side in the hope of establishing an independent High Space Union - had been reduced to a protectorate by their former allies, who wanted access to their reserves of uranium. However, the relatively moderate Venusians and Jovians had permitted Earth to join the Mandate in order to counterbalance the hard-line Martian Reich.

== Plot ==
"Collision Orbit" begins in early 2191 on the sleepy asteroid Obania, which is suddenly endangered by a smaller asteroid after a random collision with an antimatter body alters its orbit. "Spatial engineer" Jim Drake, tugboat pilot Rob McGee, and young heiress Ann O'Banion (the daughter of Obania's founder) decide to divert the asteroid, which would enable them to claim it in recompense; their ultimate plan is to repurpose it as a laboratory for Drake's antimatter experimentation. However, an attempt to install a paragravity engine at the center of the asteroid (which they name "Freedonia") fails due to a combination of bad luck and economic sabotage by Mandate authorities. In the end, Drake succeeds by steering a mass of anti-iron into a borehole, with the resultant matter-antimatter reaction functioning as an improvised rocket and propelling Freedonia into a safe orbit. The Mandate reluctantly recognizes Drake's claim, and his son Rick - angered and disillusioned by the Mandate's treatment of his father, and inspired by his success - returns to join the family business.

"Minus Sign" begins in March 2191, immediately after the conclusion of the preceding story, but switches viewpoints to Rick Drake, also a spatial engineer and a rising star with Interplanet who has just joined Drake, McGee and Drake as a partner. The venture is immediately in danger of losing Freedonia due to an inflated tax assessment, prompting the younger Drake and McGee to set out for a mysterious asteroid exhibiting anomalous properties which has just been accelerated by to solar escape velocity by a seetee collision. The voyage becomes a race against a Mandate science expedition commanded by the affable, coolly-superior Earthman Paul Anders, but upon arrival at the nameless asteroid the two ships experience strange phenomena, and an unidentified warship appears and exchanges fire with the Mandate cruiser. McGee eventually figures out that the asteroid - while composed of normal matter - hails from a region of the universe where the arrow of time is reversed, and that they are being carried into the past as long they remain within its proximity. Drake and McGee escape the asteroid just before its yet-to-happen collision with the antimatter body, salvaging a large amount of mined industrial diamonds and the survivors of the Mandate cruiser, which had been destroyed in a battle with its earlier self.

"Opposites—React!" begins six months later, and again switches viewpoints - this time to Paul Anders, who is returning to service after a period of convalescence, having lost much of his enthusiasm for the Mandate and for Interplanet. Earth's Commissioner in the Belt shows him evidence that the Martians have located a contraterrene alien artifact, and assigns him a cruiser crewed by dissidents from the Mandate powers that are loyal to Interplanet. Anders gives Ann O'Banion a lift to Freedonia, where he inspects the antimatter lab the Drakes have built, and learns that they have reached an impasse in their research, as they cannot damp the vibrations of the anti-iron they are attempting to work with. He reluctantly threatens his hosts with imprisonment unless they consent to an Interplanet buyout, but the situation changes when McGee calls to report that he has located an intact seetee artifact in an eccentric orbit above the ecliptic, but is being menaced by a Martian Reich warship. With O'Banion aboard, Anders' cruiser travels to the artifact, which turns out to be an enormous ovoid space station built by the long-vanished inhabitants of the destroyed extrasolar antimatter world. Anders and O'Banion enter the artifact and learn it is a matter-antimatter annihilation power plant, consisting of matter and antimatter hemispheres separated by a sophisticated physical-contact interface - exactly what humans need to work with antimatter. They also find the bodies of a Jovian Soviet expedition, recently killed by the still-active station's dangerous unattended processes, and a live Rob McGee. Attempting to return to the ship, the three find themselves marooned by the Martian spy Falkenberg, who had been impersonating Anders' first officer and had suborned his crew. However, McGee had managed to hide his own spacecraft in the antimatter half of the artifact; Anders - who has fallen in love with O'Banion - renounces the Mandate, and the trio returns to the Belt with the secret of the interface. They learn that the hijacked cruiser had gone to Freedonia to destroy the Drakes' antimatter lab, but had fallen victim to a minefield around the asteroid, whose existence Anders had withheld from Falkenberg.

Seetee Shock begins about four years later. Drake, McGee and Drake has been driven into bankruptcy by Mandate lawfare, but Martin Brand, a celebrity spatial engineer and former acquaintance of Jim Drake, has salvaged the firm and renamed it "Seetee Inc." His nephew Nicol Jenkins has come from Earth to work on Seetee's great project, a copy of the alien power station known as the Brand Transmitter: an antimatter-powered broadcast-energy device that - Jenkins hopes - will usher in a post-scarcity era and decrease political tensions among the uranium-dependent great powers. Plagued with anxiety in the hostile environment, Jenkins returns to Freedonia from a solo trip to collect antimatter only to find that the asteroid's complement has been gassed unconscious, and weapons engineer Jean Lazarene has gone AWOL with Seetee Inc.'s entire stockpile of recently-manufactured antimatter-warhead missiles. While Jenkins is investigating the theft, one of the stolen missiles is used against Freedonia, causing no direct casualties but lethally irradiating everyone present, including Anders, McGee, and both Drakes. After transporting his unconscious comrades to Obania, Jenkins learns they all have about a week to live; he resolves to use his remaining time to complete the Brand Transmitter. To that end, he hurries to Pallas, the Mandate capital, where his uncle Martin Brand heads Seetee Inc.'s main office. He finds Brand concerned only with financial matters; cheerfully indifferent to the promise of antimatter, he is cynically attempting to monetize the disaster by orchestrating a merger of Seetee, Inc. and Interplanet. A mysterious enemy begins using the stolen missiles to destroy warships of the High Space Guard, causing widespread panic and civil unrest, with rumors of an anti-Mandate uprising by the Free Space Party. Jenkins and Brand are both arrested, and agents of all four powers within the Guard approach Jenkins with offers of escape and employment if he will manufacture antimatter weapons for their respective governments, thereby ruling out all four as the perpetrators of the raid upon Freedonia. Pallas is consumed with rumors of a major war between the powers, an of a revolt of the asterites. Amid mounting social disintegration, Jenkins is bailed out by his uncle's former secretary, the beautiful, mysterious Jane Hardin, with whom he visits his uncle and extorts the resources to complete the Transmitter. On their way to Freedonia, they are waylaid by a Free Space Republic warship and diverted to Obania, which has been taken over by the revolutionaries at great cost in lives. However the revolt is faltering, and the rebels attempt to detain Jenkins and trade him to the Mandate in exchange for an amnesty. He escapes and makes his way to Freedonia, where he - working through the increasingly debilitating symptoms of radiation poisoning - completes and activates the Transmitter. Severely ill, he allows Hardin - whom he discovers is an agent of Interplanet - to take him back to a hospital on Obania. Awakening there, he learns that the reality of the Transmitter has sent political shockwaves throughout the Solar System. A fleet sent to destroy it mutinied, planetary governments have fallen, the Mandate is to be dissolved, Interplanet has gone bankrupt, and Brand has been arrested. He is also informed that a revolutionary anti-radiation serum has been isolated from McGee's blood, and that he and the others irradiated at Freedonia will make a full recovery. The charismatic Brand is tried and acquitted, and immediately announces a plan to use the limitless power of the Transmitter to terraform Titan. Jenkins leaves the hospital and is met by a contrite Hardin, who tells him she wants to apologize after having seen the positive changes he has wrought. They resolve to go see the new world together.

== Reviews ==
Groff Conklin gave Seetee Ship a mixed review, finding it "a good story if you can bear ploughing through pages of literary corn starch." P. Schuyler Miller noted that Williamson's rewrite of the stories into a more cohesive novel was "an excellent job of unification." New York Times reviewer Villiers Gersen, however, commented that "it is a pity that the quality of Stewart's writing [...] ranks only slightly above that of a comic-strip adventure."

== "Terraforming" ==
The word "terraforming" was a neologism coined in Collision Orbit, although the concept itself had been suggested previously. Williamson's definition of the term in the story differs significantly from the concept's later development; he applied it to a process for creating a shirt-sleeve environment on very small asteroids, by installing a fictional "paragravity" unit at their centers, thereby endowing them with Earth-level gravity and making them capable of retaining a breathable atmosphere.

During the 1980s, American geographer Richard Cathcart successfully lobbied for formal recognition of the verb "to terraform". The word was added to the fourth edition of the Shorter Oxford English Dictionary in 1993.

== See also ==
- Terraforming in popular culture

== General and cited references ==
- Seetee series listing at the Internet Speculative Fiction Database
- The first science fiction story featuring antimatter, Symmetry Magazine (2008)
- Chalker, Jack L.; Owings, Mark (1998). The Science-Fantasy Publishers: A Bibliographic History, 1923–1998. Westminster, MD and Baltimore: Mirage Press, Ltd. p. 299.
- Contento, William G. "Index to Science Fiction Anthologies and Collections".
- Williamson, Jack; Higgins, William S. (2010). Opposites—React!. Royal Oak, Michigan: Haffner Press. p. 158.
