= Firehair =

- Firehair, as seen in her own title, Girl of the Golden West, Firehair (Winter 1948).

Publication information
- Publisher: Fiction House
- First appearance: Rangers #21 (Feb. 1945)
- Created by: "John Starr" and Lee Elias

In-story information
- Alter ego: Lynn Cabot
- Notable aliases: Princess Smith

Firehair is a 1945–1952 comic book character who appeared in features in the comic book anthology Rangers Comics, published by Fiction House during the Golden Age of Comic Books. She is a Western heroine, a young woman raised by Native Americans who fights predatory white settlers who try to cheat or kill her adopted people.

The character has been criticized as a paternalistic portrayal of a white savior, similar to the jungle girl comics that were prevalent at the time.

== Publication history ==
Firehair premiered in Rangers Comics #21 (cover-dated Feb. 1945) and appeared in every issue up to #65 (May 1952). She also appeared in 11 issues of her own quarterly title from Winter 1948 to Spring 1952. Issues #3 to #6 were titled Pioneer West Romances featuring Firehair. The characters was created by a pseudonymous writer, "John Starr", and artist Lee Elias. The majority of the art was done by Elias, Bob Lubbers, and Robert Webb. An entirely different character of the same name, but with a similar origin (only male) appeared in DC Comics, drawn by Joe Kubert.

== Fictional character biography ==
Firehair was originally Lynn Cabot, the mild-mannered daughter of Boston businessman John Cabot. She was accompanying her father west with a caravan of rifles from the town of Plainsville, each traveling under the alias of "Smith". On the prairie, Cabot's wagon train was ambushed by what seemed to be Dakota Indians. Cabot and the trail hands were all killed in the ambush and Lynn was thrown from the overturned wagon and left for dead.

She was found by Little Ax, a member of the Dakota Indian tribe of the area. Little Ax recognized the attackers as white men disguised as Dakotas. Seeing that Lynn was still alive, he brought her back to his tribe and reported the ambush to the tribal leader, his father Tehama. There Lynn was nursed back to health. However, the traumatic experience and the fall induced amnesia in her. At Little Ax's behest, Tehama allows Lynn to stay under his son's care, as she is the only witness who can clear the Dakotas of suspicion in the raid.

Under Little Ax's care, Lynn quickly took to the tribal ways and soon grew to be the equal of any member, male or female. Dubbed Firehair by the tribe, she showed abnormal physical prowess and a single-minded ferocity in battle and ultimately surpassed everyone as a warrior. Her skill and judgment make her an advisor to Tehama.

Sometime later, Firehair helped drive off a raid on the tribe's horse pen by thieves, led by an area outlaw named Fingers. Fingers recognized Firehair, for he and his gang led the raid on her father's caravan, disguised as Dakotas. Fingers and his gang stalk Firehair and fire upon her later as she and Little Ax hunt. Falling from her horse, Firehair struck her head and regained her lost memory. Seeking justice for her father, the woman rode to Plainsville and confronted Fingers' gang in a shack outside of town. Later, she outwitted a pair of con artists trying to claim the Cabot inheritance by presenting a lookalike for Lynn.

But once she returned to Plainsville, Lynn found that she loved life with the Dakotas more than life in white civilization. She returned to the tribe and resumed her career as the Dakotas' fiercest and best warrior, Firehair.

Firehair is very strong and athletic. She is a fierce and capable hand-to-hand fighter, often beating male adversaries. She is an accomplished horse rider and quickly tamed a wild stallion, which she named Devil's Eye. She is also skilled at using a knife or bow and arrow, abilities taught to her during her convalescence by Little Ax, and with a revolver. The latter skill was apparently learned during her life as Lynn Cabot. Firehair exhibits a keen eye, a suspicious nature, a fearless attitude in the face of danger, and a great deal of drive and determination. Most of the Dakota tribe look to her as a de facto leader in the absence of Chief Tehama.

According to Jess Nevins' Encyclopedia of Golden Age Superheroes, Firehair "fights the pirates of the Queen of the Mississippi, the Blackfeet, the Pawnees, cowgirl outlaws like the Six-Gun Siren, evil white men, and other Old West-style villains."
