= Legion of Space series =

Book series by Jack Williamson

The Legion of Space is a space opera science fiction series by American writer Jack Williamson. The story takes place in an era when humans have colonized the Solar System but dare not go farther, as the first extra-solar expedition to Barnard's Star failed and the survivors came back as babbling, grotesque, diseased madmen. They spoke of a gigantic planet, populated by ferocious animals and the single city left of the evil "Medusae". The Medusae bear a vague resemblance to jellyfish, but are actually elephant-sized, four-eyed, flying beings with hundreds of tentacles. The Medusae cannot speak, and communicate with one another via a microwave code.

== Inspiration ==
While attending a Great Books course, Williamson learned that Henryk Sienkiewicz had created one of his works by taking the Three Musketeers of Alexandre Dumas and pairing them with John Falstaff of William Shakespeare. Williamson took this idea into science fiction with The Legion of Space, the first of the Legion of Space series.

== Stories ==
The stories in the series are:

- The Legion of Space (1934, 1947)
- The Cometeers
- One Against the Legion
- The Queen of the Legion
- Nowhere Near

== Plot and characters ==
The series employs the plot device of the false document, purporting to have been written by a 20th-century American capable of experiencing the lives and adventures of his remote descendants in future centuries and writing them down. Williamson may have been influenced by the similar provenance which Edgar Rice Burroughs provided for The Moon Maid and The Moon Men a decade earlier.

The Falstaff character is named Giles Habibula. He was once a criminal, and can open any lock ever made. In his youth he was called Giles the Ghost. Jay Kalam (Commander of the Legion) and Hal Samdu (an anagram of "Dumas") are the names of the other two warriors.

The name Habibula seems to imply an Arab or Muslim background (it means "beloved of Allah" in Arabic). However, since the character displays few other signs of such a background, and since he bears an English first name going back to the Norman Conquest, Williamson seems to have rather implied a mixture of ethnicities and cultures during the centuries of spaceward expansion.

In this story, these warriors of the 30th century battle the Medusae, the alien race from the lone planet of Barnard's Star. The Legion itself is the military and police force of the Solar System after the overthrow of an empire called the Purple Hall that once ruled all humans.

In the novel, renegade Purple pretenders ally themselves with the Medusae as a means to regain their empire. But the Medusae, who are totally unlike humans in all ways, turn on the Purples, seeking to destroy all humans and move to the Solar System, as their own world, far older than Earth, is finally spiraling back into Barnard's Star. (This rationale for an invasion of Earth - the invaders coming from an older, dying planet, and having an existential need to find a new home - dates back to H.G. Wells' classic The War of the Worlds.)

One of the Purples, John Ulnar, supports the Legion from the start, and he is the fourth great warrior. His enemy is the Purple pretender Eric Ulnar, who sought the Medusae out in the first place, seeking to become the next Emperor of The Sun.

The Medusae conquered the Moon, set up their bases there, and went on to attempt conquest of the Solar System. The Medusae had for eons used a greenish, artificial greenhouse gas to keep their dying world from freezing. The Medusae learned from the first human expedition to their world that the gas rots human flesh, and the Medusae use it as a potent chemical weapon, attempting ecological destruction by means of projectiles fired from the Moon. Their vast spaceships also have very effective plasma weapons, very similar to those the Romulans had in a Star Trek episode called Balance of Terror.

This first Legion tale featured a secret weapon called AKKA. Using a space/time distortion, it could erase from the Universe any matter, of any size, anywhere, even a star or a planet. This weapon of mass destruction was entrusted to a series of women.

AKKA was used in the past to overthrow the Purple tyranny. In this story the Medusae tried to steal the secret weapon, but failed and their invasion force was destroyed. When they were wiped out, the Moon, where they had established their base, was erased out of existence.

At the end of the story, John Ulnar falls in love with the keeper of AKKA, Aladoree Anthar, and marries her. Aladoree Anthar is described as a young woman with lustrous brown hair and gray eyes, beautiful as a goddess.

Williamson then wrote The Cometeers, in which, twenty years after The Legion of Space, the same characters battle an alien race, this one of different origin.

In this second tale they fight the Cometeers, which are energy beings controlling a "comet" which is really a giant force field containing a swarm of planets populated by their slaves. The slave races are of flesh and blood, but none are remotely similar to humans. The Cometeers cannot be destroyed by AKKA, as they are incorporeal from the Universe's point of view and exist for the most part in an alternate reality. The ruling Cometeers feed on their slaves and literally absorb their souls, leaving disgusting, dying hulks in their wake. It is said that they do so because they were once fleshly entities themselves of various species. Hence, the ruling Cometeers keep other intelligent beings as slaves and "cattle." They fear AKKA, though, as it can erase all their possessions.

They are defeated by the skills of Giles Habibula. Giles broke into a secret chamber guarded by complex locks and force fields that the incorporeal Cometeers could not penetrate. In it the ruler of the Cometeers had kept its own weapon of mass destruction, one that would cause the Cometeers to disintegrate. The ruling Cometeer kept this weapon to enforce its rule over the others of its kind. Once the Cometeers were destroyed, their slaves were ordered by the Legion to take the comet and leave the Solar System, and never return.

Another novel, One Against the Legion, tells of a Purple pretender who sets up a robotic base on a world over seventy light years from Earth, and tries to conquer the Solar System using stolen matter transporter technology. In this story robots are outlawed, as they are in the Dune series. The story also features Jay Kalam, lobbying to allow the New Cometeers to leave the Solar System in peace, as many people were demanding that AKKA be used to obliterate the departing swarm of planets once and for all.

In 1982, Williamson published a final Legion novel, The Queen of the Legion. Giles Habibula reappears in this final novel, which is set after the disbanding of the Legion.

== Works by other authors ==
The 1988 Combat Command series of roleplaying gamebooks included an entry based on The Legion of Space series, simply called The Legion at War. It was written by Andrew Keith with an introduction by Jack Williamson. Although it included references to characters and events in Williamson's past books in the series, all of the characters were new, including Vice Admiral David Ulnar, a descendant of John Ulnar. David Ulnar is the reader's point of view character. This book also includes a new original enemy, the Ka'slaq, who have invaded Star League space. Ulnar is a commander of the Legion's Ninth Defense squadron and must repel the invading alien fleet. The reader is required to make decisions based on strategies and wise deployments of his fleet ships. Dice rolls and combat charts included in the book determine battle outcomes. However, much of the gamebook involves attempting to outthink the Ka'slaq, thus, having more ships than the opponent is not a guarantee of victory and sometimes works against you.

Australian comic book pioneer, Phillip Wearne, at the age of 17, adapted Legion of Space into the first comic book published in Southern Australia. Wearne drew the art for the comic book of the same name. The comic book was published in 1943 by H.E. Hoffman.

The Legion of Space inspired the book Unleashed in Space, part of the Wishbone book series.

== Critical reception ==
John Clute rated the series as "The best of [Williamson's] pre–World War Two work"; comparing it to the Lensman series, he noted that "Williamson's relative incapacity to impart a sense of brute scale was perhaps balanced by a very much greater gift for characterization".
