= Undersea Trilogy =

Three science fiction novels by Frederik Pohl and Jack Wiliamson

The Undersea Trilogy
- Cover of the omnibus edition
- Author: Frederik Pohl & Jack Williamson
- Cover artist: David Mattingly
- Language: English
- Genre: Science fiction
- Publisher: Baen Books
- Publication date: 1992
- Publication place: United States
- Media type: Print (Paperback)
- Pages: 501
- ISBN: 0-671-72123-2
- OCLC: 25903328

The Undersea Trilogy is a series of three science fiction novels by American writers Frederik Pohl and Jack Williamson. The novels were first published by Gnome Press beginning in 1954. The novels were collected in a single omnibus volume published by Baen Books in 1992. The story takes place in and around the United States Sub-Sea Academy and the underwater country of Marinia. The hero of the stories is cadet Jim Eden of the Sub-Sea Academy.

== Books ==
=== Undersea Quest ===
Undersea Quest
- Author: Frederik Pohl & Jack Williamson
- Illustrator: First edition
- Cover artist: Ed Emshwiller
- Language: English
- Genre: Science fiction
- Publisher: Gnome Press
- Publication date: 1954
- Publication place: United States
- Media type: Print (Hardback)
- Pages: 189
- OCLC: 1804239
- Followed by: Undersea Fleet

Undersea Quest is the first volume of the trilogy. It was first published by Gnome Press in 1954 in an edition of 5,000 copies.

==== Plot summary ====
Intrigue surrounds the mining of uranium beneath the underwater dome city of Marinia. Jim Eden, expelled from the Sub-Sea Academy on trumped-up charges, seeks out his uncle who disappeared while mining at the bottom of Eden Deep. While looking for clues to his uncle's disappearance, Jim runs into some men who try to stop him.

==== Reception ====
Galaxy reviewer Groff Conklin praised the novel's craft, but faulted its espousal of "the petrifying process that military academies put children through" and the "us-against-the-world" attitude it engendered. Anthony Boucher received it favorably, commending its "vigorous storytelling [and] excellent detailing of the background of a submarine civilization." P. Schuyler Miller found it "the kind of book that should predispose Captain Video fans to our kind of science fiction."

=== Undersea Fleet ===
Undersea Fleet
- Author: Frederik Pohl & Jack Williamson
- Illustrator: First edition
- Cover artist: Ed Emshwiller
- Language: English
- Genre: Science fiction
- Publisher: Gnome Press
- Publication date: 1956
- Publication place: United States
- Media type: Print (Hardback)
- Pages: 187
- OCLC: 1488168
- Preceded by: Undersea Quest
- Followed by: Undersea City

Undersea Fleet is the second volume of the trilogy. It was first published by Gnome Press in 1956 in an edition of 5,000 copies.

==== Plot summary ====
David Craken, a firm believer in the existence of sea serpents, disappears in search of them only to reappear drifting offshore months later. His friend Jim Eden and members of the Sub-Sea Academy retrace David's journey and soon run into the strange creatures that had been only mythical before.

==== Reception ====
Galaxy reviewer Floyd C. Gale praised the novel for its "fast and furious" action.

=== Undersea City ===
Undersea City
- Author: Frederik Pohl & Jack Williamson
- Illustrator: First edition
- Cover artist: Wallace Wood
- Language: English
- Genre: Science fiction
- Publisher: Gnome Press
- Publication date: 1958
- Publication place: United States
- Media type: Print (Hardback)
- Pages: 224
- OCLC: 2195313
- Preceded by: Undersea Fleet

Undersea City is the third volume of the trilogy. It was first published by Gnome Press in 1958 in an edition of 5,000 copies, of which only 3,000 were bound.

==== Plot summary ====
Krakatoan Dome was specifically designed to cope with the tremors of its earthquake prone area. Problems begin when more quakes occur than had been expected, which many experts suspect are being artificially created. The Sub-Sea Academy assigns Jim Eden to investigate, because of his experience working underwater, and also because his uncle is the prime suspect.

==== Reception ====
Floyd C. Gale reviewed the book as follows:

Frankly and honestly, a gee-whiz yarn, it reaches its target—youngsters—with plenty of mystery, action, and suspense."

== See also ==
- List of underwater science fiction works
- Attack from Atlantis – 1953 novel by Lester del Rey
- Sealab 2020 – American animated television series
- Sealab 2021 – American adult animated television series

== Sources ==
- Brown, Charles N.; William G. Contento. "The Locus Index to Science Fiction (1984-1998)".
- Chalker, Jack L.; Mark Owings (1998). The Science-Fantasy Publishers: A Bibliographic History, 1923-1998. Westminster, MD and Baltimore: Mirage Press, Ltd. pp. 303–307.
