= Beyond Mars =

American comic strip by Jack Williamson

- The first issue (January, 1989) of Jack Williamson and Lee Elias' Beyond Mars comic book with reprints of the comic strip.
- Author: Jack Williamson
- Illustrator: Lee Elias
- Current status/schedule: Concluded daily & Sunday strip
- Launch date: February 17, 1952; 74 years ago
- End date: March 13, 1955; 71 years ago
- Syndicate(s): Chicago Tribune New York News Syndicate
- Publisher(s): Blackthorne Publishing; IDW Publishing
- Genre: Science fiction

Beyond Mars is a science fiction comic strip written by Jack Williamson and drawn by Lee Elias. The Sunday strip ran in the New York Daily News from February 17, 1952, to March 13, 1955, initially as a full tabloid page and, near the end, as a half tab. It is set in the same universe as the Williamson novels Seetee Ship and Seetee Shock.

== Background and creation ==
Writer Jack Williamson reminisced about how Beyond Mars was started: "That was when TV had just begun to hurt the circulation of Sunday papers. Somebody at the [New York Daily] News noticed that all the competing papers had the same comics and that the News might gain a competitive edge by developing some original strips of its own." A review in The New York Times of Williamson's novel Seetee Ship stated that his writing "ranks only slightly above that of comic strip adventures." Reading this comment, Daily News editor Ana Barker concluded that Williamson was the right person to write a new adventure strip for them.

Williamson said his plot formula was heavily inspired by the strip Dick Tracy, in that each episode involved a conflict with a new villain and a new group of colorful characters.

== Characters and story ==
The strip's storyline was loosely based on Seetee Ship: in the year 2191, freelance pilot and "spatial engineer" Mike Flint carried out odd jobs - usually on behalf of beautiful women - across the wild frontier of the asteroid belt. Flint had a base on the small habitable asteroid of Brooklyn Rock, from where he and his alien partner/sidekick Tham Thmith (a Venusian with metal-based biology and a speech impediment) operated a classic Art-Deco rocketship powered by antimatter.

As the product of a notable SF writer, the strip was somewhat more scientifically accurate than most of its contemporaries, at least by period standards. According to Williamson, the editorial staff often altered his copy to remove scientific concepts that they believed were too advanced for their readership. The pre-Mariner Venus and Mars were depicted as the homes of intelligent species (the Martians being essentially sentient bivalves), and even very small asteroids could be made to retain a habitable biosphere via gravitational manipulation.

Comics historian Dave Karlen reviewed:

In 1952 the New York News wanted to celebrate their success from a steady increase in newspaper circulation and decided an exclusive feature created for their publication would be just the ticket... It is said Chester Gould suggested many of the story lines and helped Williamson from time to time on a proper way to present a comic strip plot. This colorful space-opera drama with a stellar Dick Tracy feel was beautifully rendered in the "Noel Sickles School" by Elias with its amazingly detailed exotic locals, amusing alien creatures, beautiful women and lots of two-fisted action. But as with many strips over time, the New York News believed their creation did not live up to its expectations and cut the size to a half-page in late 1954, which probably contributed to its untimely demise on March 13, 1955 as the creative team wrapped up some final loose ends in the last Sunday.

== Reprints ==
Jack Williamson and Lee Elias' Beyond Mars trade paperback (1987)

In 1987, the entire strip was reprinted in two Blackthorne trade paperbacks. Blackthorne also reprinted it as series of comic books. IDW Publishing reprinted the entire strip in an oversized hardback book in October 2015.

== Sources ==
- Daily News Sunday comics section (1952–55)
- John Clute and Peter Nicholls, editor, The Encyclopedia of Science Fiction (Jack Williamson entry), St. Martin's Press, 1993. ISBN 0-312-09618-6
- Jack Williamson and Lee Elias, Shel Dorf (editor), Beyond Mars (two volumes), Blackthorne, 1987. ISBN 0-932629-84-9
