= Wall Around a Star =

1983 novel by Jack Williamson

- First edition
- Author: Frederik Pohl; Jack Williamson
- Cover artist: David B. Mattingly
- Language: English
- Series: Saga of Cuckoo
- Genre: Science fiction
- Publisher: Del Rey Books
- Publication date: January 12, 1983
- Publication place: United States
- Pages: 275
- Awards: 1984 Locus Award - Best SF Novel (21st place)
- ISBN: 0-345-28995-1
- OCLC: 9184254
- Preceded by: Farthest Star

Wall Around a Star is a science fiction novel by American writers Frederik Pohl and Jack Williamson, the second book of the Saga of Cuckoo series, following Farthest Star. The book was published by Del Rey Books on January 12, 1983, with cover art by David Mattingly.

In this novel linguist Jen Babylon is called on to translate alien records which may explain the nature of "Cuckoo", a sphere built around a star, and thus save the galaxy.
