= Lifeburst =

1984 novel by Jack Williamson

First edition (publ. Del Rey Books) Cover art by Don Dixon

Lifeburst is a novel by Jack Williamson published in 1984.

== Plot summary ==
Lifeburst is a novel in which huge spaceships in the 22nd century attack the peaceful ships that come to contact them.

== Reception ==
Dave Langford reviewed Lifeburst for White Dwarf #89, and stated that "This book will take you right back, probably to before you were born."

== Reviews ==
- Review by Algis Budrys (1985) in The Magazine of Fantasy & Science Fiction, May 1985
- Review by Tom Easton (1985) in Analog Science Fiction/Science Fact, September 1985
- Review by Robert Coulson (1986) in Amazing Stories, May 1986
