= The Cometeers =

1950 novel by Jack Williamson

- Dust-jacket from the first edition
- Author: Jack Williamson
- Illustrator: Edd Cartier (frontispiece and endpapers)
- Cover artist: Edd Cartier
- Language: English
- Series: Legion of Space Series
- Genre: Science fiction
- Publisher: Fantasy Press
- Publication date: 1950
- Publication place: United States
- Media type: Print (Hardback)
- Pages: 259
- Preceded by: The Legion of Space
- Followed by: The Queen of the Legion

The Cometeers is a collection of two science fiction novels by the American writer Jack Williamson. It was first published by Fantasy Press in 1950 in an edition of 3,162 copies. The novels were originally serialized in the magazine Astounding in 1936 and 1939, and later released as individual paperbacks by Pyramid Books.

One Against the Legion was also published in Great Britain in 1970, in a paperback edition by Sphere Books Ltd. This edition included an additional novel, Nowhere Near, chronologically the fourth in the Legion of Space series. It featured, among others, Giles Habibula, and Lilith, a new Keeper of the Peace and mistress of AKKA.

== Contents ==
- "The Cometeers"
- "One Against the Legion"

== Plot summary ==
=== The Cometeers ===
Young Bob Star—the son of hero John Star and Aladoree Anthar, the Keeper of AKKA—lives in the Purple Hall on Phobos, feeling like a prisoner. Grim news arrives about a "comet" approaching the Solar System, a green comet that moves about as if managed by intelligent beings. These presumed aliens are referred to as The Cometeers by the news media.

After the Cometeers penetrate the secret archives of The Green Hall and carry out the information that a man named Merrin is alive, the Council of The Green Hall decides to destroy the comet with the secret weapon AKKA. However, Jay Kalam, the commander of the Legion, seeks peaceful contact with the aliens first. The Green Hall rescinds its order to destroy the comet. Kalam draws up a plan to protect the Keeper, safeguard Merrin, and attempt contact with the Cometeers.

Merrin is actually Stephen Orco - Bob Star's acquaintance at the Legion Academy. Merrin is, in fact a psychopath, but also an incredibly brilliant, former Legionnaire who once subjected Bob Star to horrific torture with the help of the Iron Confessor device developed by the "Reds" of Old Earth. Kalam tells Bob that an entrepreneur, Edward Orco, found in space a life-support space capsule with a child inside whom Orco adopted under the name Stephen. Stephen Orco after graduating from the Academy, was assigned to Callisto. There, he created a vortex gun based on the plasma weapons of the Medusae and raised a revolt against the Green Hall.

Aladoree Anthar's attempt to destroy the rebels with AKKA failed, as Stephen Orco duplicated the same weapon. However, the Legion was able to develop its vortex cannon and forced Orco to surrender. Orco bargained for his life and wrung a concession that only Bob Star would subsequently have the right to kill him. Kalam orders Bob Star to make sure Orco does not escape the prison, implying that Star should execute him if necessary to fulfill that order. Star accepts the duty, but is uncertain he could kill Orco.

Kalam leaves Star on Neptune, where Orco is kept in a secret prison, and goes off on a goodwill mission to the Cometeers. At the prison, Bob Star sees an image of a girl who begs him with gestures to kill Orco. Suddenly, the Cometeers attack the prison. Before Bob Star can bring himself to kill Orco, the Cometeers free the prisoner and murder all his jailers. Surviving legionnaires Giles Habibula and Hal Samdu, along with Bob Star, find the wrecked ship of Jay Kalam, which had been destroyed by a Cometeer spaceship not long after leaving Neptune. Then they locate and commandeer a rebel ship, the Halcyon Bird, and fly away. But a lone Cometeer overtakes them and destroys the ship's engines.

The heroes land on a mysterious asteroid - the base of a brilliant scientist (but they also find traces of the Cometeers having preceded them). Jay Kalam finds an encrypted journal, which he endeavors to decipher. Bob Star once again sees the girl – this time, the girl becomes real and joins him by using a kind of teleportation. She speaks a language unknown to the Legionnaires. She is desperate to tell them something, but they only understand her name – Kay Nymidee.

The asteroid is drawn into the green comet. It is really no comet, but a vast structure filled with planetoids and an artificial star. Giles Habibula, who was once a thief and an expert lock-breaker, finds a hidden cache of fuel, and with it, the four Legionnaires and Kay fly the Halcyon Bird to the main comet planetoid, where they are captured by Cometeers.

They are thrown into a prison ship along with hundreds of other humans. Kalam suddenly recognizes the language that Kay Nymidee speaks. She is a descendant of the Spanish crew of a research spaceship captured by Cometeers centuries earlier. She knows that in the center of the main planetoid is a weapon that can destroy the incorporeal Cometeers. Bob Star can rouse the prisoners to revolt; they seize the prison ship and bring the Legionnaires and Kay to the central planetoid. After many challenges, they enter the locked chamber holding the weapon, where they find ... an empty box!

The ruler of the Cometeers arrives, along with Stephen Orco, who has been transformed into a Cometeer. They plan to kill the humans. Kalam stalls for time. He reveals to Steven Orco that Orco is an android, an artificial person created on the mysterious asteroid by the exiled scientist Eldo Arruni. Realizing what a dangerous being he had made, Arruni placed Orco in a capsule and sent it into space. While Jay Kalam stalls, Giles Habibula seeks to open a hidden compartment in the box. He does so, and inside, he finds a mysterious weapon, which he passes to Bob Star. Now knowing that Orco is not human, Star overcomes his Iron Confessor conditioning and destroys both Orco and all the Cometeers by means of the weapon.

With the Cometeers vanquished, their alien slaves are no longer hostile to the humans. All captured humans are freed: Bob Star's parents are found safe and sound among them. With the death of Orco, AKKA is once more a force that can be used to protect humankind. The slaves of the Cometeers agree to take the comet beyond the Solar System. Bob Star introduces Kay to his mother, and names her his bride-to-be. Giles finds Hal Samdu and encourages him to come along to “see if we can’t find some proper human food and drink – “.

=== One Against the Legion ===
Captain Chan Derron of the Legion of Space is given charge of a particularly important task: overseeing the construction of a locked chamber on a remote island, where a famous scientist will field-test his latest invention. This device has such power and capability that the scientist – Dr. Max Eleroid – fears it himself, and wants to turn it over to the Legion as an adjunct weapon to AKKA, in the defense of humankind.

Once the chamber has been constructed, the work crew is shuttled away, leaving Derron behind as a sole guard. Eleroid and an assistant soon arrive with a heavy box. They enter the chamber, and close and lock the massive door. Alone on duty outside, Derron suddenly realizes his weapon is missing from its holster. Over his communicator he hears a cry for help from Dr. Eleroid: “Help! Thith man – he ith not – “.

Derron cannot open the door – it's locked from the inside. But when the Legion flagship lands, they find the door unlocked, and Dr. Eleroid dead on the floor, stabbed with the bayonet affixed to Derron's service weapon. The assistant, also dead, is there, but Eleroid's fearful device is missing. Derron is arrested, interrogated, imprisoned. He is branded a traitor and a liar. He survives for two years in prison. Then he escapes.

Two years later, Derron is still on the run, and the Legion faces a different crisis. Someone calling himself the Basilisk is kidnaping people – mostly wealthy people, successful gamblers at a famous orbiting casino. They are later found dead with a small clay figure of a snake, curled into a letter B, on or near them. No one understands how this is being accomplished. Many think the Basilisk is Chan Derron. Derron, who is angered because the Basilisk has been planting evidence implicating him, has made the capture of the Basilisk his life's work.

Jay Kalam, Commander of the Legion, agrees to meet with Gaspar Hannas, the casino's owner, along with Hal Samdu and Giles Habibula. Minutes after he agrees to this, he receives a message from the Basilisk, along with one of the clay figurines. The message states that the Basilisk will kidnap the highest winner at the casino every night henceforth.

At the casino, a lot is revealed about Giles's past, filling in background that was only hinted at in the previous Legion of Space novels. Besides being an able cook, an expert geodesic engine man, a legendary lock-picker, and an epicurean, he is a peerless pickpocket, a skill he uses to identify Chan Derron, who is at the casino under a false identity – Charles Derrel. The Basilisk makes good on his threat: despite the presence of Kalam, Samdu, Giles, and a number of Legion agents, an addicted gambler known as Abel Davian, that night's biggest winner, is snatched from the middle of a police guard and replaced with a ferocious, winged creature of a species no one can recognize.

After killing the monster, the Legionnaires realize that Davian is gone. Two other people are also missing: Charles Derrel, a.k.a. Chan Derron, and the extremely beautiful woman who accompanied him. (Derron had involuntarily become partnered with the strikingly beautiful woman, Vanya Eloyan, whom he suspects to be a wanted fugitive, a female android known as Luroa.) Jay Kalam orders Giles Habibula to use all of his marginally legal abilities to find and follow Derron; the Legion forces will in turn follow Giles.

Derron, having been separated from Vanya is delayed in getting away. He finally escapes from pursuit and gets back to his hidden spaceship, the Phantom Atom, which was docked in the vicinity. There he finds that Giles has preceded him (Giles had figured out where Derron's spaceship was from info he filched from Derron's pocket). Pretending to admire Derron, Giles convinces him to take him along. While Derron is involved with navigation, Giles sends a short message to Jay Kalam, and the Legion begins pursuit.

Meanwhile, the Legion has received terrible news: the Basilisk has whisked away the entire Green Council, all sixty members, along with a number of other important people, including the Keeper of AKKA. In all, ninety-nine persons are now stranded on a small, rocky island in the middle of an ocean on an inhospitable planet, eighty light-years from Earth. He announces his plan: to round off the number of hostages to one hundred, then let all of them die save one, whom the Basilisk will return to the Solar System to give testimony about the Basilisk's enormous power. Jay Kalam becomes the one-hundredth hostage.

There is a third person aboard the Phanton Atom: Vanya Eloyan. She is bent on killing Derron, whom she is convinced is the Basilisk. Giles discovers her and, after a confrontation, becomes convinced that she is not the dangerous android Luroa, but the person she says she is: Stella Eleroid, the daughter of the murdered Dr. Eleroid. She also knows the operating principles of her father's stolen invention (she calls it a geofractor), and it explains the Basilisk's ability to transport people and objects at will. Chan Derron bursts in on them, and disarms them. He then convinces them that, whether they believe it or not, he is innocent, and is trying to take down the Basilisk as well. Giles suddenly asks him about a ring he is wearing. Derron says he received it from his mother, who received it from her mother. Giles recognizes it as the ring he gave to the long-lost love of his life – Chan Derron is his grandson! The three form a tentative alliance.

Giles sends a message to the pursuing Legion fleet to back off, that Derron is innocent (they don’t believe him, suspecting he's being tortured). Giles tunes up the Phantom Atom's geodesic engines, allowing it to outpace the fleet. Their destination is an anomaly Derron had discovered, ten billion miles from the sun and above the plane of the Solar System – he suspects it is connected to the Basilisk.

When they reach the object, Stella Eleroid recognizes it as an immense copy of her father's invention - she is familiar with it, having worked as her father's assistant. The three board the immense, deserted structure, and Stella begins to accustom herself to the controls. They locate the hundred missing persons, but cannot remove them immediately: the rocky island, fast being flooded by the rising waters, is shielded from the geofractor's effects.

Chan Derron suspects that the Basilisk is among the hostages, and is somehow operating a second geofractor from that location. The Basilisk plans to be the sole survivor who returns. Derron volunteers to be dropped into the sea alongside the island, because he thinks he can identify the Basilisk. Remembering details from his trial, he suspects that the Basilisk had killed Max Eleroid's assistant and taken his place before Eleroid arrived at the location to test his device (Eleroid was extremely nearsighted and even with glasses would not notice the switch). Stella uses her father's invention to transport Derron. He reaches the remaining hostages, now crammed into the small remaining space, and contrives to test his hunch on Abel Davian, the winning gambler who had been one of the Basilisk's victims. Davian is proven to be the Basilisk. Derron smashes the small hand-held calculator Davian was using to remotely control a backup geofractor: almost immediately, hostages begin to disappear from the island, as Stella can now reach them.

Davian pours out his bitter motivation: restoration of his family to the glory they enjoyed under the old Empire, and revenge against the casino for ruining him through his gambling addiction. Soon only Chan Derron and the Basilisk are left on the island. A smaller twin of the massive geofractor – the backup geofractor - is falling through the atmosphere straight at them. Derron feels himself being transported back by Stella as the last person rescued from the island, leaving the Basilisk to meet his fate.

== Reception ==
Anthony Boucher and J. Francis McComas praised the novels as "swashbuckling romantic adventure . . . which make more recent imitators look pallid indeed.". P. Schuyler Miller noted that while the novels' "smoothly written space-action plots" were effective, the Giles Habibula character steals the show. Everett F. Bleiler declared The Cometeers to be "much more elaborate, much more thought-provoking than The Legion of Space, especially with Star's psychological difficulties."

== See also ==
- 1936 in science fiction
- 1950 in science fiction

== Sources ==
- Chalker, Jack L.; Mark Owings (1998). The Science-Fantasy Publishers: A Bibliographic History, 1923-1998. Westminster, MD and Baltimore: Mirage Press, Ltd. p. 237.
- Tuck, Donald H. (1978). The Encyclopedia of Science Fiction and Fantasy. Chicago: Advent. p. 462. ISBN 0-911682-22-8.
