= The Legion of Space =

1934 novel by Jack Williamson

- Dust-jacket from the first edition
- Author: Jack Williamson
- Illustrator: A. J. Donnell
- Cover artist: A. J. Donnell
- Language: English
- Series: Legion of Space Series
- Genre: Science fiction
- Publisher: Fantasy Press
- Publication date: 1947
- Publication place: United States
- Media type: Print (Hardback)
- Pages: 259
- Followed by: The Cometeers

The Legion of Space is a science fiction novel by the American writer Jack Williamson. It was originally serialized in Astounding Stories in 1934, then published in book form (with some revisions) by Fantasy Press in 1947 in an edition of 2,970 copies. A magazine-sized reprint was issued by Galaxy in 1950, with a standard paperback following from Pyramid Books in 1967. The first British edition was published by Sphere Books in 1977. The Legion of Space has been translated into German, French, Italian and Japanese . It has also appeared in the omnibus Three from the Legion, which compiles the novel and all but one of its sequels.

== Plot background ==
The story takes place in an era in which humans have colonized the Solar System but dare not go farther, as the first extra-solar expedition to Barnard's Star failed and the survivors came back as babbling, grotesque, diseased madmen. These survivors spoke of a gigantic planet, populated by ferocious animals, and of the single city of the evil "Medusae". The Medusae are elephant-sized, four-eyed, flying 'jellyfish' with hundreds of tentacles. The Medusae cannot hear or speak, but communicate with one another via radio waves.

== Plot summary ==
The Legion is the military and police force of the Solar System. It was created to keep the peace after the overthrow of the "Purples", a dynasty that ruled all humanity for generations. John Ulnar, a young graduate of the Legion academy, shares a surname with the Purples but is an enthusiastic supporter of the Legion.

A weapon called AKKA was used to defeat the Purples. Using a space/time distortion, it erases matter from the Universe—any matter, of any size, even a star or a planet. The secret of AKKA is kept in one family, descended from its creator, and is passed down from mother to daughter. One of the Legion's most important tasks is to guard the current Keeper, a beautiful young woman named Aladoree Anthar.

Through the machinations of his uncle, a powerful politician with a hidden agenda, John Ulnar is assigned to Aladoree's guard force at a secret fort on Mars. When she is kidnapped by a huge alien spaceship, John and the three other survivors of the guard force follow her kidnappers to a planet of Barnard's Star. They crash-land and must battle their way across a savage continent to the sole remaining citadel of the Medusae.

John Ulnar's uncle and his nephew have allied with the Medusae as a means to regain their empire, and have kidnapped Aladoree to ensure that AKKA is not used against them. The Medusae, however, turn on the Purples, seeking to destroy all humans and move to the Solar System, as their own world, far older than Earth, is spiraling into Barnard's Star.

John Ulnar and his companions rescue Aladoree, but the invasion of the Solar System has already begun. The Medusae conquer the Moon, set up bases there, and bombard Earth with gas projectiles. John, Aladoree, and their companions land on a ravaged Earth. Fighting off cannibals maddened by the gas, they build AKKA and destroy the Medusae fleets (and Earth's Moon as well).

== Critical reception ==
Brian W. Aldiss and David Wingrove, noting that Williamson had produced much better work, dismissed The Legion of Space as a Gosh-wow! epic which thundered along "on the cloven heels of Doc Smith." Everett F. Bleiler, although faulting the novel's "stylistic and developmental problems . . . notably the irritating characterizations of the musketeers and John Ulnar," concluded that The Legion of Space is carried along by a drive and verve that make it one of the better early space operas.

Thrilling Wonder Stories found the novel to be "space opera with a vengeance -- with passably good characterization imbedded in an interplanetary chamber of horrors that . . . seems to go on forever [and becomes] a little tiresome". P. Schuyler Miller wrote that the novel "does not pretend to be anything more than a good space-adventure yarn in the swashbuckling tradition -- and formula -- of The Three Musketeers". Lester del Rey. writing in 1978, praised The Legion of Space as "a classic adventure story".

== Sources ==
- Chalker, Jack L.; Mark Owings (1998). The Science-Fantasy Publishers: A Bibliographic History, 1923-1998. Westminster, MD and Baltimore: Mirage Press, Ltd. p. 235.
- Tuck, Donald H. (1978). The Encyclopedia of Science Fiction and Fantasy. Chicago: Advent. p. 462. ISBN 0-911682-22-8.
