= Ultra the Multi-Alien =

- Cover to Mystery in Space #103, art by Lee Elias.

Publication information
- Publisher: DC Comics
- First appearance: Mystery in Space #103 (November 1965)
- Created by: Dave Wood (writer); Lee Elias (artist)

In-story information
- Alter ego: Ace Arn
- Team affiliations: Justice League
- Abilities: Super-strength, flight, magnetokinesis and electrokinesis

Ultra the Multi-Alien (Ace Arn) is a science fiction superhero featured in comics published by DC Comics. He first appeared in Mystery in Space #103 (1965), pushing out Adam Strange and Space Ranger from that title. He was created by writer Dave Wood and artist Lee Elias.

== Fictional character biography ==
=== Pre-Crisis ===
Ultra was originally a human astronaut named Ace Arn, living in an unspecified future era when spaceflight is commonplace. After crash landing on a planet in a far off solar system, he is attacked by four aliens, each a member of a different species from their respective planets Ulla, Laroo, Trago, and Raagan. The four aliens simultaneously shoot him with rayguns designed to transform him into an obedient member of their respective species. Because all four rays hit him at the same time, he is instead transformed into a combination of the four aliens, possessing superhuman strength, flight, and the ability to manipulate electricity and magnetism.

Arn combined the first letter of the worlds the four aliens were from, along with the first letter of his name to come up with: U-L-T-R-A, his new name. He soon finds a device that enables him to return to his human form, giving him a secret identity. His series lasted until issue #110 (1966), when Mystery in Space was cancelled. He would not reappear for several years.

=== Post-Crisis ===
Ultra was one of Wizard Magazine's "Mort of the Month", a featurette showcasing comic characters considered low-quality. Grant Morrison used him both in their series Animal Man and Aztek.

The character appeared in Starman #55 (1999), in which Ultra, along with Space Ranger, is riding in Space Cabbie's cab and looking for Starman's cosmic staff for the Space Museum. Each regales the other with different interpretations of Jack and Mikaal Tomas rescuing Starfire from a space pirate.

Geoff Johns was the next writer to use these concepts. A storyline in Stars and S.T.R.I.P.E. involved Young Justice teaming with Star-Spangled Kid and S.T.R.I.P.E. to stop a group of Larroo (one of the four aliens from Ultra's origin) from using their ray to turn everyone in Blue Valley into Larroo. It was established that the Larroo had invented the ray, but were preparing to sell it to the other three alien races.

Ultra appeared as a background character in the Infinite Crisis event. Having traveled back in time to the present era, Ultra is one of the many space-faring heroes who aid Donna Troy in the fallout of the Rann–Thanagar War. He also appears in Superman/Batman #31 (2007), overwhelmed by an alien influence that is affecting many of the part-alien heroes on earth. After a rampage through the American town of Dalesville, he leaves (causing more destruction upon his exit) with Supergirl, also affected. In Superman/Batman #33, he and other influenced aliens try to destroy the titular heroes. Fortunately, his mind is soon cleared of all influence and the villain behind it all, Despero, is defeated.

The planet Larroo appears in Action Comics #867, where Brainiac attacks it while searching the universe for Superman. A city containing all four races which created Ultra is contained within a forcefield, shrunken, and captured. Their star is detonated and Superman is left floating among the remains of the planet. Ultra is held on Brainiac's ship before being freed and taken into the custody of the United States government.

=== The New 52 ===
In The New 52, Ultra the Multi-Alien is re-established as the result of an experiment of Byth Rok, who combined the DNA of alien prisoners in an attempt to create the Slayer of Worlds. The original incarnation of the character is reintroduced in Justice League Unlimited (2025), where he encounters a time-displaced Supergirl, Mister Terrific, and Martian Manhunter in the year 2212.

== Powers and abilities ==
Ultra the Multi-Alien's body is composed of the anatomy of the four different aliens from Ulla, Laroo, Trago, and Raagan. Each of these parts grants him a different power: superhuman strength, flight, and the ability to generate electricity and manipulate magnetic charges. Ultra is an expert pilot in his human identity and wears a hyper-converter belt which enables him to switch back and forth from his normal and powered forms.

== In other media ==
- Ultra the Multi-Alien makes a non-speaking cameo appearance in the Batman: The Brave and the Bold episode "The Siege of Starro!".
- Ultra the Multi-Alien makes a cameo appearance in Superman: Unbound.
- Ultra the Multi-Alien was discussed in a segment of Conan, with the eponymous Conan O'Brien calling him a mess.

== Reception ==
In American Comic Book Chronicles, John Wells writes: "Debuting in MIS #103, Ultra the Multi-Alien was undeniably different but not in ways that many readers thought were any good... The concept itself wasn't necessarily bad... but Ultra just looked silly. He was part bald blue man and part hairy green monster set atop a bird's leg and a lightning bolt".
