= Bob Lubbers =

American comic strip and comic book artist

- Born: January 10, 1922
- Died: July 8, 2017 (aged 95)
- Areas: Cartoonist, Penciller, Inker
- Notable works: Tarzan; Li'l Abner; Long Sam
- Awards: Inkpot Award 2002

Robert Bartow Lubbers (January 10, 1922 – July 8, 2017) was an American comic strip and comic book artist best known for his work on such strips as Tarzan, Li'l Abner and Long Sam.

== Biography ==
Born Robert Bartow Lubbers in 1922, he began as an illustrator for his school newspaper. In his teens, he played trombone in a big band five nights a week while studying during the day with George Bridgman and other instructors at the Art Students League. He entered the comic book field when he was 18 years old, as he recalled:

My pal Stan Drake and I left Bridgman's life class one day and marched down to Centaur and sold the comic mag features we'd created. Before long I was doing features at Fiction House until the War.

For Centaur (aka the Comics Corporation of America), Lubbers drew such features as the Arrow, Reef Kincaid, Red Riley and the Liberty Scouts. After Centaur folded in 1942, he signed on as art director at Fiction House, where he drew Firehair in Rangers Comics, Camilla in Jungle Comics, Señorita Rio in Fight Comics, Captain Wings in Wings, plus such features as Space Rangers, Rip Carson, Flint Baker and Captain Terry Thunder.

Remembering his first, pre-World War II employment at Fiction House, Lubbers recalled "a young teenager who'd come in now and then to show a little sample book he'd made up called Panther Lady. We could see this kid had the right stuff. He had no luck selling it to Fiction House, but it was just as well. Frank Frazetta has become a glittering star in the world of fine art."

After World War II, he returned to comic books. Fiction House "welcomed me back and features and covers poured out until 1950, when my mentor Ray Van Buren led me to UFS and Tarzan and NCS membership."

=== Comic strips ===
Bob Lubbers' The Saint (October 4, 1959)

In 1950, he began his association with Tarzan, continuing on that strip for the next four years. In 1954, he first did work at the Al Capp studio and entered, as he put it, Capp's "star-studded world of movers and shakers".

He began drawing The Saint in 1959, and he also worked on Big Ben Bolt. Frank Godwin's Rusty Riley was running in more than 150 newspapers when Godwin died of a heart attack in 1959 at his home in New Hope, Pennsylvania. The final Rusty Riley strips were drawn by Lubbers, who recalled, "In 1959, Frank Godwin, the artist who did Rusty Riley, died. Sylvan Byck at King Features asked if I'd do the last two weeks in Godwin's style to end the series. I admired his book illustrations and was honored to have the privilege to do it." In 1960–1967, he drew Secret Agent X-9 (as "Bob Lewis"), and he contributed to Li'l Abner during the 1970s.

Lubber's own strips were Robin Malone (for NEA from 1967 through May 1970) and Long Sam, created by Al Capp and syndicated by United Feature Syndicate from 1954 to 1962. Although Long Sam was initially written by Capp, who soon turned the duties over to his brother, Elliot Caplin, Lubbers eventually assumed the writing duties himself in the strip's final phase. Long Sam was, like Li'l Abner, a hillbilly strip, though based on a female character. The title character, Sam, was a tall, voluptuous, naive mountain girl who had been raised in a hidden valley away from civilization by her Maw, who hates men and wishes to protect her daughter from them. The stories deal with Sam's inevitable discovery of the world and its discovery of her. Lubbers concluded Robin Malone in an ambiguous manner that left the survival of the protagonist unresolved.

=== Comic books ===
In addition to DC Comics' "The Vigilante" feature in Action Comics, he drew Westerns for Pines (Standard/Nedor) comics in the 1950s. He briefly drew comic books for Marvel Comics including work on The Defenders #61 (July 1978) and The Human Fly #15–16 (December 1978 – January 1979). Lubbers is sometimes mistakenly said to have drawn for DC Comics during the 1980s. A young inker named Bob Lewis did work for DC during that period, but he was not Lubbers using a pseudonym.

== Reprints ==
In 2001, when his work was collected in the 100-page Glamour International: The Good Girl Art of Bob Lubbers, comics historian Paul Gravett reviewed:

Bob Lubbers is not the celebrated cartoonist he should be, but thanks to a legion of Italian admirers, he is now getting his day in the sunshine in his 80th year. The latest edition of the long-running Italian magazine Glamour International No. 26 (2001, $34.95) pays tribute to his Good Girl Art in a deluxe, bi-lingual 100-page, 12" x 12" inch square showcase, edited by the respected authority Alberto Beccattini. Lubbers himself writes the commentary tracing his fascinating life and 40-year career in comics, accompanied by photos, sketches, a host of brand new colour illustrations and covers, plus some specially colored panels of his Firehair, Camilla and Captain Wings comic books from his Fiction House days in the Forties and from his string of newspaper strips, Tarzan... Long Sam, The Saint, Secret Agent X9, Robin Malone and L'il Abner. Bob credits being in the right place at the right time for keeping him busy, jumping from one series to the next or juggling several at once. But this modesty overlooks his constantly fresh and lively draughtsmanship, his crisp storytelling skills and his particular lifelong love affair with the female form, qualities that have kept him in constant demand... Writing about his experiences in the comics industry, his encounters with stars, presidents and models, his passions for playing music and golf, and his current success at devising crossword puzzles, Lubbers comes across as a genial, big-hearted man, who has always enjoyed his life and developing a variety of talents. This book concludes with the most thorough checklist of his work to date, 11 pages meticulously compiled by Beccattini with help from many experts.

== Awards and exhibitions ==
In 1998, Lubbers was honored with the Yellow Kid Award at Rome's Expo Cartoon Festival. Lubbers received an Inkpot Award in 2002. Sunday strips by Lubbers were displayed in 2003 at the Tarzan! exhibition at the Musée du quai Branly in Paris.

In 2016 he was inducted into the National Cartoonist Society's Hall of Fame, one of only 16 cartoonists to receive that honor.

Lubbers died on July 8, 2017, at the age of 95.

Bob Lubbers' Long Sam (May 15, 1957). Note mirror reflection with signature reversed.
