= Saga of Cuckoo =

Series of science fiction novels

Farthest Star
- Cover of the first edition.
- Author: Frederik Pohl; Jack Williamson
- Cover artist: Philip Perlman
- Language: English
- Series: Saga of Cuckoo
- Genre: Science fiction
- Publisher: Ballantine Books
- Publication date: 1975
- Publication place: United States
- Pages: 246
- ISBN: 0-345-24330-7
- OCLC: 073857
- Followed by: Wall Around a Star

Wall Around a Star
- Author: Frederik Pohl; Jack Williamson
- Cover artist: David B. Mattingly
- Language: English
- Series: Saga of Cuckoo
- Genre: Science fiction
- Publisher: Del Rey Books
- Publication date: January 12, 1983
- Publication place: United States
- Pages: 275
- Awards: 1984 Locus Award - Best SF Novel (21st place)
- ISBN: 0-345-28995-1
- OCLC: 9184254
- Preceded by: Farthest Star

The Saga of Cuckoo is a series of science fiction novels by American writers Frederik Pohl and Jack Williamson. It consists of two novels, Farthest Star and Wall Around a Star.

The books feature an interstellar teleporter that leaves the original being behind and sends only a duplicate. When a person is duplicated, the original can just pass out of the machine without a second thought. The copies also can be "edited" at destination.

== Farthest Star ==
Farthest Star was published by Ballantine Books in 1975, as a fix-up of the 1973 novella "Doomship" and the 1974 serial "The Org's Egg".

In the novel, engineer Ben Charles Pertin is selected to be humanity's representative in a multi-race mission to reach "Object Lambda", a mysterious object traveling towards the galaxy at 1/6th lightspeed. Since the object is still approaching, Ben and the others are transported to the probeship Aurora by a matter duplication transporter. While the original goes on with his life, the duplicate (Ben James) and his Companion, Doc Chimp, work with the rest of the beings to construct a faster drone to get a transporter in orbit of the object, racing against time as the ionizing radiation from the ship's fusion drive is slowly killing them. After a struggle, the drone is successfully launched, killing all on board.

The drone performs as planned and an orbiting habitat called Cuckoo Station is constructed. A new duplicate arrives, Ben Linc.

== Wall Around a Star ==
Wall Around a Star was published by Del Rey Books on January 12, 1983. The cover art for the 1983 edition was done by David Mattingly.

In this novel linguist Jen Babylon is called on to translate alien records which may explain the nature of "Cuckoo", a sphere built around a star, and thus save the galaxy.

== Sources ==
- Pohl, Fred; Jack Williamson (1983). The Saga of Cuckoo (SFBC ed.). Nelson Doubleday. OCLC 9879683.
