= In extremis =

In extremis is a Latin phrase meaning "in the farthest reaches" or "at the point of death."

In extremis or extremis may also refer to:

- Extremis (2005–2006), a six-issue story arc from the Marvel Comics series Iron Man (vol. 4), published in issues 1 through 6
- Extremis (film), a 2016 Netflix Original short documentary about end-of-life care
- Extremis: Drop Ride to Doom, an attraction at the London Dungeon
- In Extremis (Days Between Stations album), 2013
- In extremis (film), a 2000 film by Etienne Faure
- "In Extremis" (Person of Interest), an episode of the TV series Person of Interest
- In Extremis (play), a 2006 play by Howard Brenton
- In Extremis (Thinking Plague album), 1998
- "Extremis" (Doctor Who), the sixth episode of the tenth series of the series Doctor Who
- "In extremis", a naval term about maneuvering to avoid collision
