= Richard Cathcart =

American geographer

Richard Brook Cathcart (born 1943) is an American geographer who specializes in macro-engineering.

He is co-author of Macro-Engineering: A Challenge for the Future, published 2007 by Springer Science & Business Media.

== See also ==
- List of geographers
