= Jack Williamson =

American science fiction writer (1908–2006)

- Born: John Stewart Williamson; April 29, 1908; Bisbee, Arizona Territory, U.S.
- Died: November 10, 2006 (aged 98); Portales, New Mexico, U.S.
- Occupations: Writer, professor of English
- Writing career
- Pen name: Will Stewart; Nils O. Sonderlund
- Period: 1928–2006
- Genre: Science fiction

John Stewart Williamson (April 29, 1908 – November 10, 2006) was an American science fiction writer, one of several called the "Dean of Science Fiction". He is also credited with one of the first uses of the term genetic engineering. Early in his career he sometimes used the pseudonyms Will Stewart and Nils O. Sonderlund.

== Early life ==
Williamson was born April 29, 1908, in Bisbee, Arizona Territory. According to his own account, the first three years of his life were spent on a ranch at the top of the Sierra Madre Mountains on the headwaters of the Yaqui River in Sonora, Mexico. He spent much of the rest of his early childhood in western Texas. In search of better pastures, his family migrated to rural New Mexico in a horse-drawn covered wagon in 1915. The farming was difficult there and the family turned to ranching, which they continue to this day near Pep. He served in the U.S. Army Air Corps in World War II as a weather forecaster.

== Writing career ==
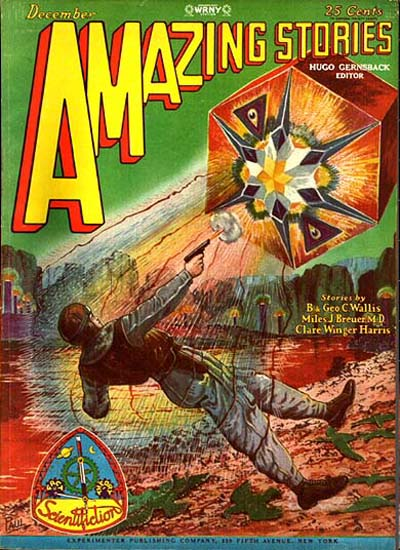
Williamson's first published story "The Metal Man" was cover-featured on the December 1928 Amazing Stories.

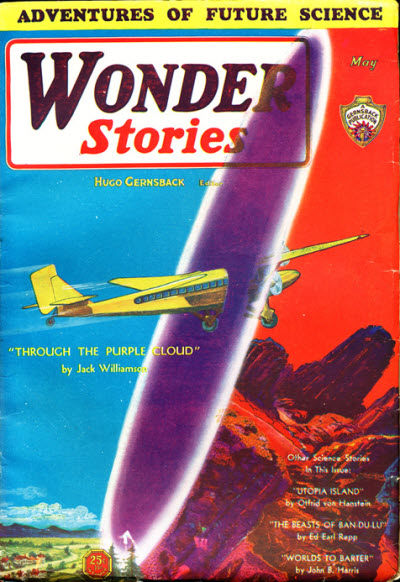
Williamson's "Through the Purple Cloud" was the cover story in the May 1931 Wonder Stories.

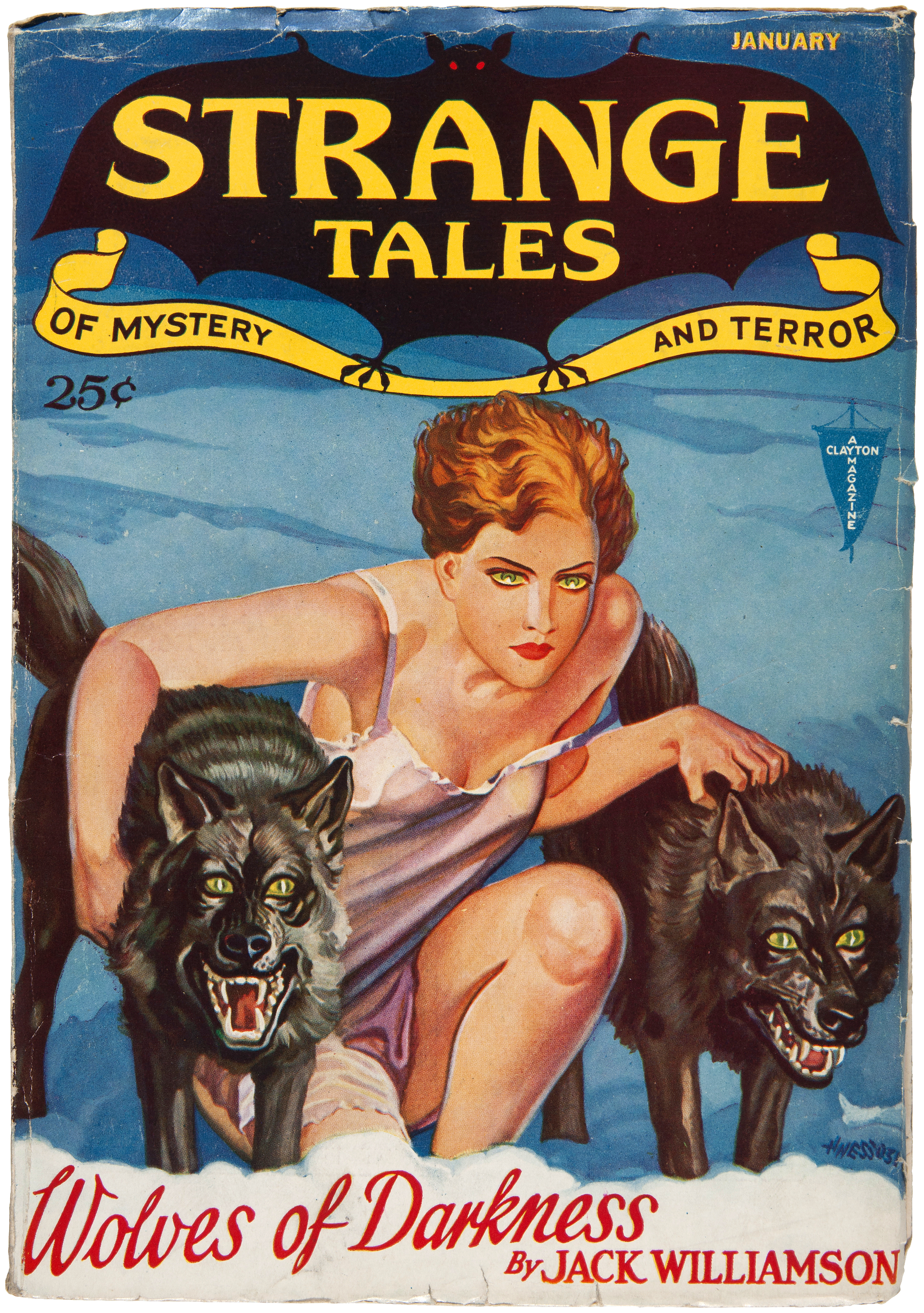
Williamson's novella "Wolves of Darkness" was the cover story in the January 1932 issue of Strange Tales.

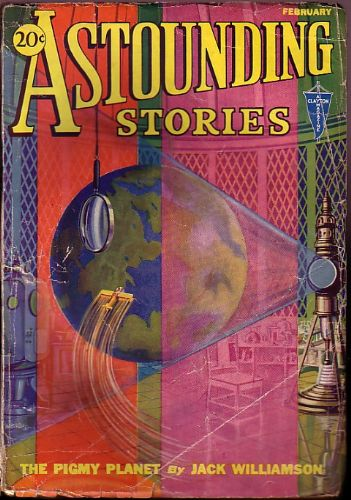
Williamson's "The Pigmy Planet" was the cover story in the February 1932 Astounding Stories.

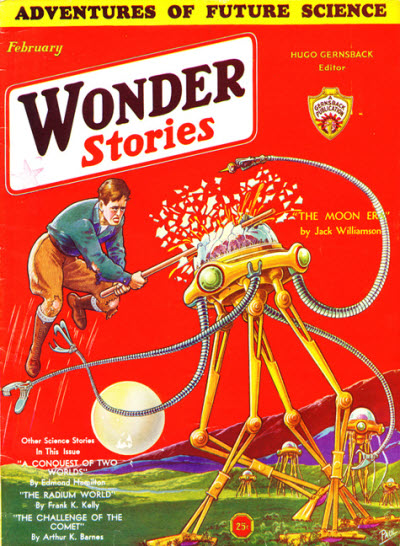
Williamson's "The Moon Era" was cover-featured on the February 1932 Wonder Stories.

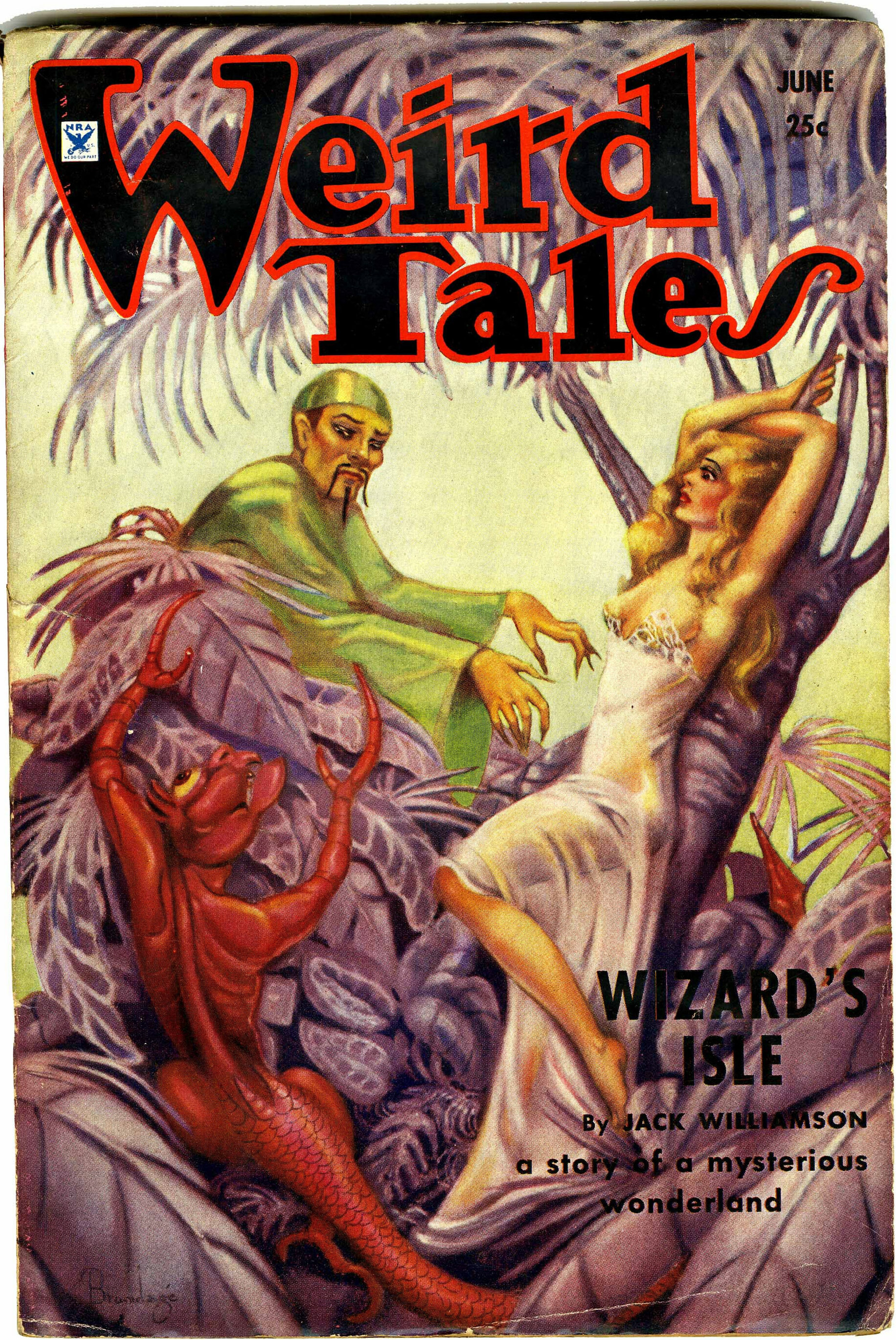
Williamson's novelette "Wizard's Isle" was the cover story in the June 1934 Weird Tales.

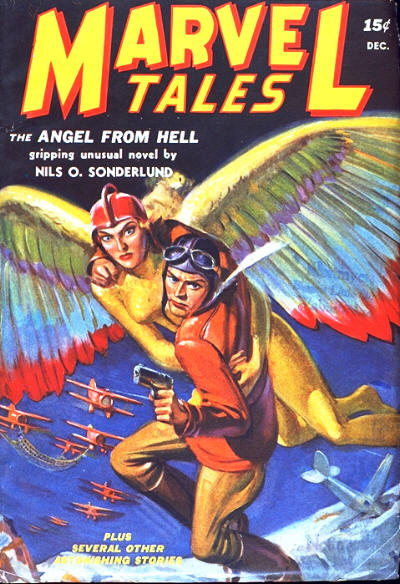
As "Nils O. Sonderlund", Williamson wrote "The Angel from Hell", the cover story in the December 1939 Marvel Tales

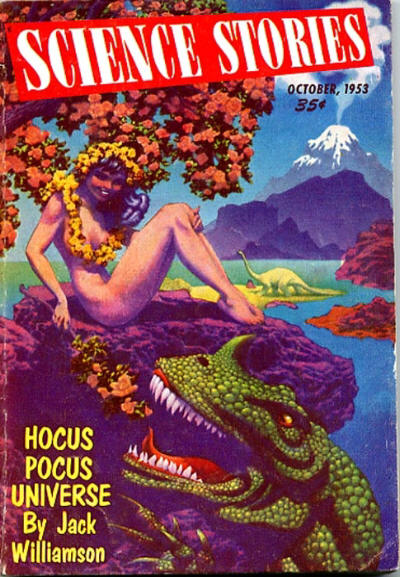
Williamson's novelette "Hocus Pocus Universe" was the cover story in the October 1953 Science Stories, illustrated by Hannes Bok.

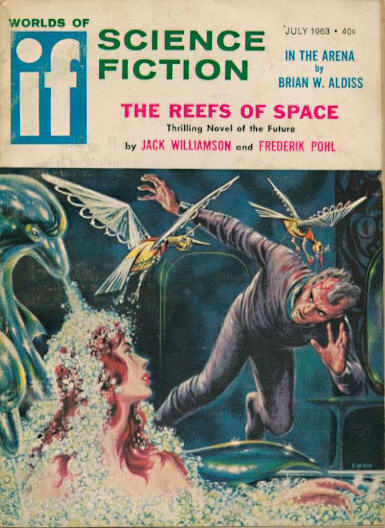
The Reefs of Space, which Williamson cowrote with Frederik Pohl, was serialized in If in 1963.

As a child Williamson enjoyed storytelling to his brother and two sisters. As a young man, he discovered the magazine Amazing Stories, established in 1926 by Hugo Gernsback, after answering an ad for one free issue. He strove to write his own fiction and sold his first story to Gernsback at age 20: "The Metal Man" was published in the December 1928 issue of Amazing. During the next year Gernsback published three more of his stories in the new pulp magazines Science Wonder Stories and Air Wonder Stories, and separately published "The Girl from Mars" by Miles J. Breuer and Williamson as Science Fiction Series #1. His work during this early period was heavily influenced by A. Merritt, author of The Metal Monster (1920) and other fantasy serials. Noting the Merritt influence, Algis Budrys described "The Metal Man" as "a story full of memorable images".

Early on, Williamson became impressed by the works of Miles J. Breuer and struck up a correspondence with him. A doctor who wrote science fiction in his spare time, Breuer had a strong talent and turned Williamson away from dreamlike fantasies towards more rigorous plotting and stronger narrative. Under Breuer's tutelage, Williamson sent Breuer outlines and drafts for review. Their first work together was the novel Birth of a New Republic in which Moon colonies were undergoing something like the American Revolution, a theme later taken up by many other SF writers, particularly in Robert A. Heinlein's The Moon Is a Harsh Mistress.

Wracked by emotional storms and believing many of his physical ailments to be psychosomatic, Williamson underwent psychiatric evaluation in 1933 at the Menninger Clinic in Topeka, Kansas, in which he began to learn to resolve the conflict between his reason and his emotion. From this period, his stories take on a grittier, more realistic tone.

By the 1930s, he was an established genre author, and the teenaged Isaac Asimov was thrilled to receive a postcard from Williamson, whom he had idolized, which congratulated him on his first published story and offered "welcome to the ranks". Williamson remained a regular contributor to the pulp magazines but did not achieve financial success as a writer until many years later.

An unfavorable review of his novel Seetee Ship, which said his writing "ranks only slightly above that of a comic strip adventure", brought Williamson to the attention of The New York Sunday News, which needed a science fiction writer for a new comic strip. Williamson wrote the resulting strip Beyond Mars (1952–55), loosely based on Seetee Ship, until the paper dropped all comics.

Beginning 1954 and continuing into the 1990s, Williamson and Frederik Pohl wrote more than a dozen science fiction novels together, including the series Jim Eden, Starchild, and Cuckoo. Williamson continued to write as a nonagenarian and won both the Hugo and Nebula Awards during the last decade of his life, by far the oldest writer to win those awards.

In his later years, he criticized attempts to write "serious" science fiction:

Maybe because of my own background of writing commercial SF for so many years, I have a great deal of respect for good craftsmanship of the sort that commercial writers must develop. The labels you hear so much of—"commercial," "serious writer," "mainstream," "hack," "New Wave," "experimental"—are usually very misleading.

In my own field, Ed Hamilton and Hank Kuttner and more recently Bob Silverberg are all writers who formed a fine command of the SF genre early in their careers and who later on used this to do work that is more consciously "literary" and hence more admired by critics. But certainly the writing they did earlier was deservedly popular among SF fandom, who evidently found these works "serious" enough to merit reading.

I am opposed, however, to literary tricks that tend towards obscurity or artificial difficulty, though I can see arguments for that kind of approach. My own experience as a teacher of writing confirms my sense that new authors with artistic ambitions may find themselves scorning too many of the old forms and patterns simply because they blindly associate them with hack work. The point is that these patterns and structures form the basic vocabulary through which all SF writers must speak. That's one reason I'm not completely sympathetic with contemporary writers like Silverberg and Chip Delany and Tom Disch, who are clearly aiming to get themselves recognized as "serious" or mainstream authors.

== Academic career ==
Williamson received his Bachelor of Arts and Master of Arts degrees in English in the 1950s from Eastern New Mexico University (ENMU) in Portales (near the Texas panhandle), joining the faculty of that university in 1960. He remained affiliated with the school for the rest of his life. In the late 1990s, he established a permanent trust to fund the publication of El Portal, ENMU's journal of literature and art. In the 1980s, he made a sizable donation of books and original manuscripts to ENMU's library, which resulted in the formation of a Special Collections department; the library now is home to the Jack Williamson Science Fiction Library, which ENMU's website describes as "one of the top science fiction collections in the world". In addition, Williamson hosted the Jack Williamson Lectureship Series, an annual lectureship where Guests of Honor and other noted authors give lectures, read from their works, and participate in lively panel discussions on a variety of topics. The lectureship is still celebrated at ENMU each year. The Jack Williamson Liberal Arts building houses the Languages & Literature, Mathematical Sciences, History, Religion & Social Sciences, and Psychology & Political Science Departments of the university, as well as the College of Liberal Arts and Sciences Dean's Office.

Williamson completed his PhD in English literature at the University of Colorado in Boulder, focused on H. G. Wells' earlier works, demonstrating that Wells was not the naive optimist that many believed him to be.

== Neologisms and other firsts ==
Williamson coined the word "terraforming" in a science-fiction story published in Astounding Science Fiction in 1942.

In 1947, Williamson was the first science fiction writer to incorporate the concept of the ion thruster into a published story. This technology was first successfully tested by NASA in 1964, first used in a space mission in 1998, and has become routine for space probes.

The word "psionics" first appeared in print in Williamson's novella The Greatest Invention, published in Astounding magazine in 1951.

Williamson is also credited with one of the first uses of the term "genetic engineering".

== Later years ==
The Science Fiction Writers of America named Williamson its second Grand Master of Science Fiction after Robert Heinlein, presented 1976.

Having been let go from ENMU during the university's financial crisis in 1977, Williamson spent some time concentrating on his writing, but after being named professor emeritus by ENMU, he was coaxed back to co-teach two evening classes, "Creative Writing" and "Fantasy and Science Fiction" (he pioneered the latter at ENMU during his full-time professorship days). Williamson continued to co-teach these two classes into the 21st century. After he made a large donation of original manuscripts and rare books from his personal collection to the ENMU library, a special collections area was created to house these and it was named the "Jack Williamson Special Collection".

In 1994 Williamson received a World Fantasy Award for Lifetime Achievement.

The Science Fiction and Fantasy Hall of Fame inducted Williamson in 1996, its inaugural class of two deceased and two living persons.

The Horror Writers Association conferred its Bram Stoker Award for Lifetime Achievement in 1998 and the World Horror Convention elected him Grand Master in 2004.

In November 2006, Williamson died at his home in Portales, New Mexico, at age 98. Despite his age, he had made an appearance at the Spring 2006 Jack Williamson Lectureship and published a 320-page novel, The Stonehenge Gate, in 2005.

Minor planet 5516 Jawilliamson is named in his honor.

== Legion of Space series ==
While attending a Great Books course, Williamson learned that Henryk Sienkiewicz had created one of his works by taking The Three Musketeers of Alexandre Dumas and pairing them with John Falstaff of William Shakespeare. Williamson took this idea into science fiction with The Legion of Space.

Desperate for money, he searched for a quick source of income. While most pulps of the time were slow to pay, the recently restarted Astounding was an exception. However, they did not accept novels, so Williamson submitted three short stories and a novelette. Learning that they were also accepting novels for serialization, he sent in The Legion of Space, which was published as a serialization in six parts. It quickly became a genre favorite, and was quickly collected into a hardcover.

The story takes place in an era when humans have colonized the Solar System but dare not go farther, as the first extra-solar expedition to Barnard's Star failed and the survivors came back as babbling, grotesque, diseased madmen. They spoke of a gigantic planet, populated by ferocious animals and the single city left of the evil "Medusae". The Medusae bear a vague resemblance to jellyfish, but are actually elephant-sized, four-eyed, flying beings with hundreds of tentacles. The Medusae cannot speak and communicate with one another via a microwave code.

The Falstaff character is named Giles Habibula. He was once a criminal, and can open any lock ever made. In his youth he was called Giles The Ghost. Jay Kalam (Commander of The Legion) and Hal Samdu are the names of the other two warriors. In this story, these warriors of the 30th Century battle the Medusae, the alien race from the lone planet of Barnard's Star. The Legion itself is the military and police force of the Solar System after the overthrow of an empire called the Purple Hall that once ruled all humans.

In this novel, renegade Purple pretenders ally themselves with the Medusae as a means to regain their empire. But the Medusae, who are totally unlike humans in all ways, turn on the Purples, seeking to destroy all humans and move to the Solar System, as their own world, far older than Earth, is finally spiraling back into Barnard's Star. One of the Purples, John Ulnar, supports the Legion from the start, and he is the fourth great warrior. His enemy is the Purple pretender Eric Ulnar, who sought the Medusae out in the first place, seeking to become the next Emperor of The Sun.

The Medusae conquered the Moon, set up their bases there, and went on to attempt conquest of the Solar System. The Medusae had for eons used a reddish, artificial greenhouse gas to keep their dying world from freezing. The Medusae learned from the first human expedition to their world that the gas rots human flesh, and the Medusae use it as a potent chemical weapon, attempting ecological destruction by means of projectiles fired from the Moon. Their vast spaceships also have very effective plasma weapons, very similar to those the Romulans had in a Star Trek episode called Balance of Terror.

The Legion works also featured a force field called AKKA which can erase from the Universe any matter, of any size, anywhere, even a star or a planet. AKKA was a weapon of mass destruction and the secret of it was entrusted to a series of women. AKKA was used in the past to overthrow the Purple tyranny. It was also used to wipe out most of the Medusae, though they had tried to steal the secret. When they were wiped out, the Moon where they had established their base was erased out of existence. At the end of the story, John Ulnar falls in love with the keeper of AKKA, Aladoree Anthar, and marries her. Aladoree Anthar is described as a young woman with lustrous brown hair and gray eyes, beautiful as a goddess.

Williamson next wrote The Cometeers which takes place twenty years after The Legion of Space in which the same characters battle another alien race, this one of different origin.

In this second tale, they fight The Cometeers who are an alien race of energy beings controlling a "comet" which is really a giant force field containing a swarm of planets populated by their slaves. The slave races are of flesh and blood, but none are remotely similar to humans. The Cometeers cannot be destroyed by AKKA, as they are incorporeal from the Universe's point of view and exist for the most part in an alternate reality. The ruling Cometeers feed on their slaves and literally absorb their souls, leaving disgusting, dying hulks in their wake. It is said that they do so, as they were once fleshly entities themselves of various species. Hence, the ruling Cometeers keep other intelligent beings as slaves and "cattle". They fear AKKA, though, as it can erase all their possessions.

They are defeated by the skills of Giles Habibula. Giles broke into a secret chamber guarded by complex locks and force fields that the incorporeal Cometeers could not penetrate. In it the ruler of the Cometeers had kept its own weapon of mass destruction, one that would cause the Cometeers to disintegrate. The ruling Cometeer kept this weapon to enforce its rule over the others of its kind. Once the Cometeers were destroyed, their slaves were ordered by the Legion to take the comet and leave the Solar System, and never return.

Another novel, One Against the Legion, tells of a Purple pretender who sets up a robotic base on a world over seventy light years from Earth, and tries to conquer the Solar System via matter transporter technology he has stolen. In this story robots are outlawed, as they are in Dune. The story also features Jay Kalam, lobbying to allow the New Cometeers to leave the Solar System in peace, as many people were demanding that AKKA be used to obliterate the departing swarm of planets once and for all.

In 1983, Williamson published a final Legion novel, The Queen of the Legion. Giles Habibula reappears in this final novel, which is set after the disbanding of the Legion.

== Works ==
=== Series ===
Legion of Space Series

1. The Legion of Space (1947; six-part serial in Astounding, 1934)
2. The Cometeers (1950; four-part serial in Astounding, 1936, plus One Against the Legion, three-part serial in Astounding, 1939)
3. One Against the Legion (1967; three-part serial in Astounding, 1939, plus "Nowhere Near")
  - Three from the Legion (1980; omnibus of three novels plus "Nowhere Near")
4. The Queen of the Legion (1983)

Humanoids Series

1. "With Folded Hands" (1947; in Astounding)
2. The Humanoids (1949; three-part serial as "...And Searching Mind" in Astounding, 1949)
3. The Humanoid Touch (1980)
  - The Humanoids / With Folded Hands (1996; omnibus)

Seetee series

An editor suggested that Williamson combine the ideas of contraterrene matter (antimatter) and asteroid mining, which inspired the Seetee (C-T) series of short stories written as Will Stewart.

- "Collision Orbit" (short story, as by Will Stewart; from Astounding, 1942)
- Seetee Shock (1949; as by Will Stewart; from Astounding, 1949)
- Seetee Ship (1951; as by Will Stewart; from previously published stories 1942–3)
  - Seetee Ship/Seetee Shock (1971, omnibus volume of both).

Undersea Trilogy (with Frederik Pohl)

1. Undersea Quest (1954)
2. Undersea Fleet (1956)
3. Undersea City (1958)
4. The Undersea Trilogy (1992; omnibus)

Saga of Cuckoo (with Frederik Pohl)

1. Farthest Star (1975)
2. Wall Around A Star (1983)

Starchild Trilogy (with Frederik Pohl)

1. The Reefs of Space (1964)
2. Starchild (1965)
3. Rogue Star (1969)
4. The Starchild Trilogy (1977; omnibus)

=== Novels ===
- The Girl from Mars (1930, with Miles J. Breuer)
- The Green Girl (1930)
- The Prince of Space (1931)
- Golden Blood (1933)
- Xandulu (1934)
- The Blue Spot (1935)
- Islands of the Sun (1935)
- Reign of Wizardry (1940) (loosely based on the story of Theseus from Greek mythology)
- Darker Than You Think (1948)
- Dragon's Island (1951; also known as The Not-Men)
- Star Bridge (1955, with James E. Gunn)
- The Dome Around America (1955; also known as Gateway to Paradise)
- The Trial of Terra (1962; from four previously published stories, 1951–1962)
- Bright New Universe (1967)
- Trapped in Space (1968)
- The Moon Children (1972)
- The Power of Blackness (1975)
- Brother to Demons, Brother to Gods (1979; from five previously published stories, 1977–78)
- Manseed (1982)
- Lifeburst (1984)
- Firechild (1986)
- Land's End (1988, with Frederik Pohl)
- Mazeway (1990)
- The Singers of Time (1991, with Frederik Pohl)
- Beachhead (1992)
- Demon Moon (1994)
- The Black Sun (1997)
- The Fortress of Utopia (1998; originally in Startling Stories, 1939)
- The Silicon Dagger (1999)
- The Stone from a Green Star (1999; originally in Amazing Stories, 1931)
- Terraforming Earth (2001; Co-winner of 2002 John W. Campbell Memorial Award)
- The Stonehenge Gate (2005)

=== Collections ===
- The Legion of Time, and After World's End (1952)
- The Pandora Effect (1969)
- People Machines (1971)
- The Early Williamson, 1975
- The Best of Jack Williamson (1978)
- The Alien Intelligence (1980)
- Millions de Soleils (1988)
- Into the Eighth Decade (1990)
- The Prince of Space/The Girl from Mars (1998; TGFM written with Miles J. Breuer)
- The Collected Stories of Jack Williamson, Volume One, The Metal Man and Others (1999)
- The Collected Stories of Jack Williamson, Volume Two, Wolves of Darkness (1999)
- The Blue Spot, and Entropy Reversed (Released Entropy) (2000; both from Astounding, 1937)
- The Collected Stories of Jack Williamson, Volume Three, Wizard's Isle (2000)
- Dragon's Island and other stories (2002; novel and two shorts)
- The Collected Stories of Jack Williamson, Volume Four, Spider Island (2002)
- Seventy-Five: The Diamond Anniversary of a Science Fiction Pioneer, Stephen Haffner & Richard A. Hauptmann, eds. (2004)
- The Collected Stories of Jack Williamson, Volume Five, The Crucible of Power (2006)
- In Memory of Wonder's Child Stephen Haffner, ed. (2007)
- The Worlds of Jack Williamson: A Centennial Tribute (1908–2008), Stephen Haffner, ed. (2008)
- The Collected Stories of Jack Williamson, Volume Six, Gateway to Paradise (2008)
- With Folded Hands… And Searching Mind, The Collected Stories of Jack Williamson, Volume Seven (2010)
- At the Human Limit, The Collected Stories of Jack Williamson, Volume Eight (2011)

=== Short stories ===
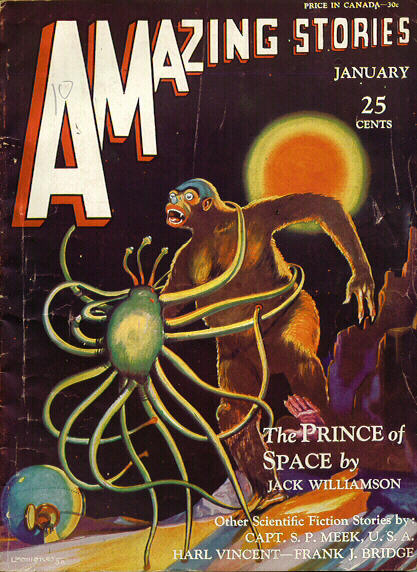
Williamson's novella "The Prince of Space" was cover-featured on the January 1931 Amazing Stories.

- The Metal Man (1928)
- The Alien Intelligence (1929)
- The Second Shell (1929)
- The Cosmic Express (1930)
- The Green Girl (1930)
- The Prince of Space (1931)
- The Meteor Girl (1931)
- The Lake of Light (1931)
- The Doom from Planet 4 (1931)
- The Moon Era (1931, 1932); also published as separate novelette
- The Pygmy Planet (1932; Cover feature in Astounding Stories February 1932)
- Salvage in Space (1933) Cover Story
- Born of the Sun (1934)
- Star Bright (1939)
- After world's end (1939)
- The Angel From Hell (1939; in Marvel Tales, writing as Nils O. Sonderlund)
- Hindsight (1940)
- Collision Orbit (1942; writing as Will Stewart; into Seetee Ship)
- Minus Sign (1942; writing as Will Stewart; into Seetee Ship)
- Opposites—React! (1943; writing as Will Stewart; into Seetee Ship)
- With Folded Hands... (1947, Awarded Prometheus Hall of Fame in 2018)
- The Man from Outside (1951)
- Beans (1958)
- A Planet for Plundering (1962)
- The Masked World (1963)
- Jamboree (1969)
- The Highest Dive (1976)
- The Humanoid Universe (1980)
- The Firefly Tree (1997)
- The Pet Rocks Mystery (1998)
- Eden Star (2000)
- The Ultimate Earth (2000; awarded the Hugo for Best Novella in 2001)
- Afterlife (2002; published in F&SF and collected in Year's Best SF 8

=== Other ===
- Will Acedeme Kill Science Fiction, Asimov's Choice Comets & Computers (Dale Books, 1978, ISBN 0-89559-022-0)

=== Autobiography ===
- Wonder's Child: My Life in Science Fiction. Bluejay Books, New York, 1984. (Hardcover)
- Wonder's Child: My Life in Science Fiction. Benbella Books, Dallas, 2005. (Paperback, updated with new photographs and epilogue)

=== Bibliography ===
- The Works of Jack Williamson: An Annotated Bibliography and Guide, Richard A. Hauptmann (NESFA Press, 1997)

== See also ==
- Android
- Anti-matter
- Genetic engineering—Williamson invented this term in Dragon's Island (1951) and it has since passed into common use
- Golden Age of Science Fiction
- Psionics
- Space opera
- Terraforming
