= The Portable Star =

- Short story by Isaac Asimov
- Country: United States
- Language: English
- Genre: Science fiction

Publication
- Published in: Thrilling Wonder Stories
- Publication type: Periodical
- Publisher: Standard Magazines
- Media type: Print (Magazine, Hardback & Paperback)
- Publication date: Winter 1955

"The Portable Star" is a science fiction short story by American writer Isaac Asimov, which appeared in the Winter 1955 issue of Thrilling Wonder Stories. "The Portable Star" was Asimov's least favorite story.

== Writing and publication ==
The story was written in March 1954, and Asimov first submitted it to Frederik Pohl, who was then an editor at Ballantine Books, for inclusion in an anthology of original stories. Pohl rejected "The Portable Star", telling Asimov in no uncertain terms how bad the story was. It was also rejected by John W. Campbell for Astounding Science Fiction and H. L. Gold for Galaxy Science Fiction. Asimov finally sold it on May 25 to Sam Mines of Thrilling Wonder. Asimov reread the story when it was published, and decided that Pohl, Campbell, and Gold had been right in considering it a bad story. In his autobiography In Joy Still Felt, Asimov states that "The Portable Star" was his least favorite story of all time. "I wasn't aware of what I was doing when I wrote it, but on reading it after it was published it seemed to me that I was deliberately trying to put sex into it to try to keep up with a new trend." Asimov never allowed the story to be reprinted, or put it in one of his collections. The only other time it appeared in Asimov's lifetime was when the publishers of Thrilling Wonder exercised their right to reprint the story, placing it in a one-shot magazine called A Treasury of Great Science Fiction Stories without Asimov's permission. It was also reprinted (with the permission of the Asimov estate) in 2007, when Winston Engle revived Thrilling Wonder Stories with an anthology of mixed reprint and new stories.

== Plot summary ==
The story concerns two couples, the Brookses and the Van Hornes, who go on a six-month space tour in a "flivver", a small space cruiser, owned by Holden Brooks. When the flivver suffers a malfunction, they land on an uninhabited planet with a nitrogen-argon atmosphere to make repairs. The planet, it turns out, is not uninhabited after all. A race of energy beings lives there, and a group of them take over the humans' bodies and begin manipulating their emotions, leading to a sexually charged encounter between Holden Brooks and Celestine Van Horne, and an attempt by Holden to murder Celestine's husband. Holden realizes that the energy beings are actually children, and he manages to use an open flame (which they have never seen before, and which is the "portable star" of the title) to frighten them away long enough to regain control of himself and flee the planet.

== Foundation timeline ==
"The Portable Star" was accompanied in the Winter 1955 issue of Thrilling Wonder Stories with a timeline of the Foundation series which included the story, along with a number of others. The timeline does not include any of the stories from I, Robot, as well as the novel The Caves of Steel, since at this time Asimov considered the Robot series separate from the Foundation series.

Asimov's Thrilling Wonder Timeline
Year	Story	Events
		A. Exploration of the Solar System
1975	"Trends"	First man-carrying flight to the Moon, against social resistance.
1985	"The Singing Bell"	Settlement of the Moon proceeds; mining operations set up.
2000	"The Martian Way"	Mars settled. Much of humanity still rebels against settlement of other planets. This is finally overcome.
2020	"Ring Around the Sun"	Venus settled. Mail service between planets established.
2050	"Marooned off Vesta"	Passage across asteroid belt no longer a matter of exploration. Commercial flights across the belt begin.
2100	"Heredity", "The Callistan Menace", "Christmas on Ganymede"	The moons of Jupiter are settled. Human eyes turn toward intergalactic space.
		B. Exploration of the Galaxy
5000		The hyperspatial drive is discovered.
5500	"The Portable Star"	Flights to other stars become feasible in small space cruisers. Very little of the Galaxy explored.
6500	"Misbegotten Missionary"	Organized space exploitation begins. Mankind begins spreading outward.
8500	"Sucker Bait"	Population has increased to the point where the inner regions of the Galaxy are overcrowded. Government-sponsored emigration to the outer reaches are begun. Most of the Galaxy now mapped and well-known. The old political structure is now incapable of handling the vast number of worlds.
10000		Earth's last atomic wars render its crust largely radioactive and that is the last straw. The Galaxy breaks up into numerous political organizations.
		C. Galactic Empire
30000	The Stars, Like Dust	The star-regions begin to agglomerate into larger groupings. The empire of Tyrann grows and declines. Trantor grows less spectacularly, but more solidly.
34500	The Currents of Space	Trantor has grown until half the Galaxy is under its sway. The Squires of Sark, with their control of the kyrt-rich Florina, are the last independent group to seriously contest Trantor's hegemony.
35000		Trantor becomes the Galactic Empire officially. Earth is all but forgotten.
36500	Pebble in the Sky, Blind Alley	Galactic Empire is at its height. Earth completely forgotten as origin of humanity. Slowly the Empire grows static and decadent. Hari Seldon is born about 47,000.
47000 to 47500	The Foundation Trilogy	The Galactic Empire settles into final decay. Its last battle with the rising Foundation dates at 47,200. The Mule rises and falls somewhere around 47,300. The Second Galactic Empire is established at 48,000.
