= Christmas on Ganymede =

- Short story by Isaac Asimov
- Country: United States
- Language: English
- Genre: Science fiction

Publication
- Published in: Startling Stories
- Publication type: Periodical
- Publisher: Better Publications
- Media type: Print (Magazine, Hardback & Paperback)
- Publication date: January 1942

"Christmas on Ganymede" is a science fiction short story by American writer Isaac Asimov. It was written in December 1940, first published in the January 1942 issue of Startling Stories, and reprinted in the 1972 collection The Early Asimov and the anthology Christmas on Ganymede and Other Stories, edited by Martin H. Greenberg. It was the twenty-sixth story written by Asimov, and the nineteenth to be published.

In his autobiography In Memory Yet Green, Asimov had this to say about Christmas on Ganymede: "I was trying to be funny, of course. I had this terrible urge to be funny, you see, and had already indulged in humor in more than one story. Writing humor, however, is harder than digging ditches. Something can be moderately well written, or moderately suspenseful, or moderately ingenious, and get by in every case. Nothing, however, can be moderately humorous. Something is either funny, or it is not funny at all. There is nothing in between."

"Christmas on Ganymede" was later included in an early Foundation Series timeline that was published in Thrilling Wonder Stories along with the story "The Portable Star".

== Setting ==
As the title indicates, the story is set on the Jovian moon Ganymede, the first story by Asimov set on that world. In the story, Ganymede has an oxygen atmosphere (which is not quite breathable by humans), and its own native flora and fauna, including a moderately intelligent native race, called Ossies for their resemblance to ostriches. There is a human settlement on Ganymede which is run by the Ganymedan Products Corporation, which exports wolframite, karen leaves, and oxite to Earth, and which employs the Ossies as a labor force.

== Plot summary ==
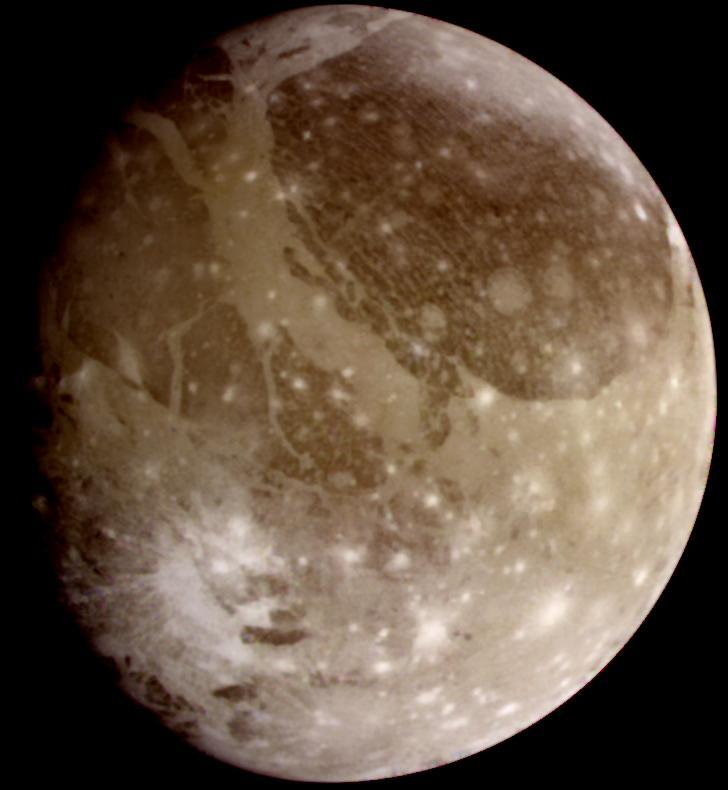
Ganymede, where the story takes place.

The humans on Ganymede face a crisis caused by Olaf Johnson, who was inspired by the impending Christmas season to tell the Ossies about Santa Claus. Now the Ossies want a visit from Santa, and they refuse to work until they get one. This will cause Ganymedan Products to fall short of its quota, costing the company its franchise on Ganymede, and costing its employees their jobs. Scott Pelham, the Commander of the base, orders his men to stage a visit by Santa, with Johnson in the starring role. A flying sleigh is built out of gravo-repulsors and compressed air jets, and eight local animals called spinybacks, after being dosed with brandy to keep them docile, are harnessed to it to serve as reindeer. Johnson, dressed vaguely like Santa, manages to fly the contraption to a crude lodge where the Ossies are waiting for him. He leaves Christmas tree ornaments in their stockings, which the Ossies take to be Santa Claus eggs. All seems well, until the Ossies demand a visit from Santa every year, and one of the men realizes they mean once every Ganymedan revolution, which is just over seven Earth days.

== Notes ==
Asimov wrote "Christmas on Ganymede" in December 1940; John W. Campbell rejected it and Frederik Pohl's purchase was canceled. Asimov realized that a Christmas story needed to be sold by July to appear by Christmas, and in June 1941 sold it to Startling Stories.
