= The Imaginary (short story) =

Short story by Isaac Asimov

- Short story by Isaac Asimov
- Country: United States
- Language: English
- Genre: Science fiction

Publication
- Published in: Super Science Stories
- Publisher: Popular Publications
- Media type: Magazine
- Publication date: November 1942

Chronology
- Series: Homo Sol Trilogy
Homo Sol	The Hazing

"The Imaginary" is a science fiction short story by American writer Isaac Asimov. It first appeared in the November 1942 issue of Super Science Stories and was reprinted in the 1972 collection The Early Asimov. Following the sale of "Half-Breeds on Venus", which was a sequel to "Half-Breed", Asimov suggested to Astounding Science Fiction editor John W. Campbell that he write a sequel to the story "Homo Sol". Campbell was unenthusiastic, but agreed. However, he rejected "The Imaginary" because it lacked the human-alien conflict he preferred in the earlier story. "The Imaginary" was the twenty-first story written by Asimov, and the twenty-ninth to be published. Due to the unusual workings of the science fiction magazine publishing industry, "The Imaginary" appeared a month after the third story in the Homo Sol Trilogy, "The Hazing".

== Plot summary ==
In the Homo Sol stories, the Galactic Federation has developed psychology into a hard science, with quantitative equations and solutions for behavior. Consequently, master psychologists are important and highly regarded.

Psychologist Tan Porus of Arcturus University has come up with a daring explanation for the mind of a particular squid species which has baffled all other Federation scientists. His formula relies on the use of imaginary numbers in its intermediate steps, which cancel out at the end and provide real answers matching the squid's observed behavior. His colleagues are outraged by this unorthodoxy.

While Porus is on leave at home, two of his students read about a series of experiments using magnetic fields and radiation to induce reactions in invertebrate animals. They devise a stimulus based on those techniques which should lead to imaginary numbers in the result of the squid equations.

They carry out the experiment, with catastrophic results. The creature starts to emit a 'death field' of radiation of an unknown type that expands uncontrollably and can potentially kill all animal and plant life.

Porus is urgently recalled from his home planet and devises a method that should theoretically stop the expansion; by changing the pH level of the water in the squid's tank beyond 3.0. He volunteers to try the method himself, using an osmium-plated suit that will temporarily resist the radiation. He pours hydrochloric acid into the tank and succeeds in destroying the field.
