= Tyrann =

Tyrann may refer to

- The Stars, Like Dust, a novel by Isaac Asimov, serialized in Galaxy Science Fiction as Tyrann
- Tyrann, a fictional planet in Asimov's Foundation universe continuity
- Tyrann Mathieu, American football player
