= Black Friar of the Flame =

- Short story by Isaac Asimov
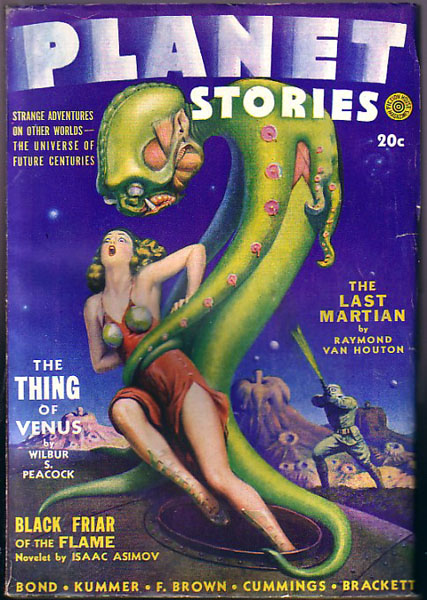
- cover art by Alexander Leydenfrost
- Country: United States
- Language: English
- Genre: Science fiction

Publication
- Published in: Planet Stories
- Publication type: Periodical
- Publisher: Fiction House
- Media type: Print (magazine, hardback & paperback)
- Publication date: Spring 1942

"Black Friar of the Flame" is a science fiction short story by American writer Isaac Asimov. It was first published in the Spring 1942 issue of Planet Stories and reprinted in the collection The Early Asimov (1972). "Black Friar of the Flame" was the thirteenth story written by Asimov, and was among his least favorite, though this was due more to the multiple rewrites and rejections the story suffered than to its admittedly modest intrinsic merits.

== Writing and re-writing ==
Asimov began work on the story, which he originally titled "Pilgrimage", on 4 March 1939. It was to be "future history", set in the far future but written as though it were a historical novel, and would take place on a galactic scale. Asimov finished the 12,600-word story and submitted it to John W. Campbell on 21 March. Three days later, Asimov got the story back with a rejection slip that said, "You have a basic idea that might be made into an interesting yarn, but as it is, it is not strong enough."

Asimov was not discouraged; he had succeeded in revising his earlier story "Trends" to Campbell's satisfaction, and decided he could do the same with "Pilgrimage". He brought a slightly longer revised version to Campbell on 25 April, and although Campbell wouldn't take it, he did ask for a second revision. Asimov submitted the second revision on May 9, only to have the story returned again. Campbell thought the story could still be salvaged, but he suggested that Asimov set it aside for several months and then return to it. Asimov started his third revision of "Pilgrimage" on 1 August and finished it in a week; by now the story had increased to 18,000 words. Asimov submitted the third revision to Campbell on 8 August. Campbell was waiting for a short novel by Robert A. Heinlein called If This Goes On— which also involved religion and revolution; if Heinlein's story was better, he would reject "Pilgrimage". As it turned out, Heinlein's story was better, and Asimov got his story back on 6 September.

When Asimov's friend and then-agent Frederik Pohl became editor of Astonishing Stories and Super Science Stories later that year, Asimov submitted "Pilgrimage" to him. Pohl also rejected it, saying the ending was weak. Asimov continued trying to sell "Pilgrimage", rewriting it twice more and changing the title to "Galactic Crusade". Finally, on 15 August 1941, Asimov learned that Planet Stories editor Malcolm Reiss was interested in the story. Following yet another rewrite, removing the religious dimension, Reiss accepted the story on 7 October 1941, running it in the Spring 1942 issue under the title "Black Friar of the Flame".

== Plot summary ==
The story is set thousands of years in the future. The Lhasinu, a reptilian race native to Vega, rule a third of the galaxy, including Earth. The rest of the galaxy is occupied by a number of independent human planets which are content to maintain the status quo. Earth is, however, the center of a cult called Loarism, whose adherents make an annual pilgrimage there. The Loarists are content to allow the Lhasinu to rule Earth as long as their own cult is not interfered with. When the people of Earth rose up against the Lhasinu five hundred years earlier, the Loarists did not aid them, and the rebellion was crushed.

The story opens with Russell Tymball, a nationalist Earthman, gaining possession of a Lhasinuic dispatch ordering the evacuation of Earth's human population and the planet's destruction. This will deal a death-blow to Loarism, and set the stage for the Second Galactic Drive, a planned Lhasinuic offensive against the disunited human worlds of the galaxy. Tymball uses the dispatch to convince Loara Paul Kane, head of the Loarists, to join in a second Terran rebellion against the Lhasinu. When a young Loarist pilgrim named Filip Sanat discovers two Lhasinu skulking around the Memorial in New York, Earth's most sacred structure, discussing the upcoming destruction of Earth, he rushes out, rouses a crowd, and starts a riot. When the Lhasinu attempt to force their way into the Memorial to arrest Sanat, they are overcome by Tymball's rebels and a human mob. Within a day, the Lhasinu are driven from New York City, and Sanat is sent out of the Solar System to enlist the help of the other human worlds.

Six months later, the Lhasinu are closing in on Earth, while the fleets of several human worlds close in on the Lhasinu. The human alliance is close to breaking up when Sanat betrays Lunar Base to the Lhasinu, forcing the allied human fleets to fight in self-defense. The Lhasinu fleet attacking Earth is defeated. At the same time, a human fleet attacking the Lhasinuic Home Fleet in the Vega system is also victorious, and the Lhasinu are forced to surrender.

== Reputation ==
"Black Friar of the Flame" has a reputation as Asimov's worst story, based partly on what he described as an "awful" title. However, it serves as a precursor to Asimov's more successful venture into future history, the Foundation Series. The planets Trantor and Santanni make their first appearance in "Black Friar of the Flame". The general situation of an embattled Earth facing a vast empire is similar to that of Pebble in the Sky, which like "Black Friar of the Flame" was based on the conflict between Judea and the Roman Empire. Another historical reference is the modelling of the climactic battle on the Battle of Salamis.

The multiple rewrites the story went through turned Asimov off rewrites. Most of Asimov's subsequent stories were published as he wrote them, or after a single revision.

After its initial publication in Planet Stories, "Black Friar of the Flame" was reprinted in a 1952 magazine published by Planet Stories called Tops in Science Fiction.
