= Legal Rites =

- Short story by Isaac Asimov, Frederik Pohl
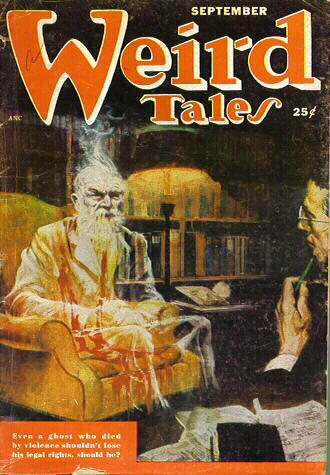
- Country: United States
- Language: English
- Genre: Fantasy

Publication
- Published in: Weird Tales
- Publication type: Periodical
- Media type: Print (Magazine, Hardback & Paperback)
- Publication date: September 1950

Chronology
| — | Time Pussy |

"Legal Rites" is a fantasy short story by American writers Isaac Asimov and Frederik Pohl, originally published in the September 1950 issue of Weird Tales, and included in the 1972 collection The Early Asimov.

== Background ==
Written in June 1940 by Isaac Asimov, the story is fantasy rather than science fiction and based on an idea from Asimov's friend Frederik Pohl. After John W. Campbell of Unknown rejected "Legal Rights" in July, Asimov gave it to Pohl, who rewrote it (using the name James MacCreigh) and renamed it "Legal Rites", which Asimov agreed was a much better title. He sold it seven years later to Weird Tales which published it in September 1950, after Asimov had forgotten about it.

It is one of several Asimov stories that center about a courtroom drama, such as "Galley Slave".

== Plot summary ==
Russell Harley travels to an isolated part of the American South-West to take possession of his inheritance, a ramshackle house known as Harley Hall, willed to him by his late uncle Sebulon Harley. Finding that the house is apparently haunted by a ghost, he flees in terror.

In a bar, he is accosted by a mysterious stranger known only as Nicholls, who persuades Harley to let him place magical paraphernalia in and around the house in an effort to control the ghost.

The ghost visits a lawyer, claiming to be the spectre of Henry (Hank) Jenkins who shared the house for many years and now claims squatters' rights. Despite attempts to mediate, the case comes to court.

Harley's lawyer disputes the claimed legal rights of the ghost and demands evidence that the ghost is actually who he claims to be. Under the pressure of the proceedings, Harley breaks down and admits that he did know of the presence of the ghost and therefore is willing to clear out of the house. The judge of course finds for the plaintiff.

At the conclusion of the case, Nicholls commiserates with Harley and his lawyer. He points out that the precedent now set means that ghosts in the state and the whole of the United States now have legal rights to haunt houses. Having said this, he simply vanishes - he was a ghost himself.
