= The Early Asimov =

1972 collection of short stories by Isaac Asimov

- First edition
- Author: Isaac Asimov
- Cover artist: Barry Kiperman
- Language: English
- Genre: Science fiction
- Publisher: Doubleday
- Publication date: November 1972
- Publication place: United States
- Media type: Print (hardback & paperback)
- Pages: 540
- ISBN: 0-385-03979-4

The Early Asimov or, Eleven Years of Trying is a 1972 collection of short stories by American writer Isaac Asimov. Each story is accompanied by commentary by the author, who gives details about his life and his literary achievements in the period in which he wrote the story, effectively amounting to a sort of autobiography for the years 1938 to 1949. (The book was followed by Before the Golden Age in 1974 and Buy Jupiter and Other Stories in 1975, which also included autobiographical material.)

The book is dedicated to John W. Campbell, the editor who bought many of the stories collected in this book.

== Contents ==
- "The Callistan Menace" (published 1940)
- "Ring Around the Sun" (1940)
- "The Magnificent Possession" (1940)
- "Trends" (1939)
- "The Weapon Too Dreadful to Use" (1939)
- "Black Friar of the Flame" (1942), novelette
- "Half-Breed" (1940), novelette, Half-Breed series #1
- "The Secret Sense" (1941)
- "Homo Sol" (1940), Homo Sol series #1
- "Half-Breeds on Venus" (1940), novelette, Half-Breed series #2
- "The Imaginary" (1942), Homo Sol series #2
- "Heredity" (1941), novelette
- "History" (1941)
- "Christmas on Ganymede" (1942)
- "The Little Man on the Subway" (1950)
- "The Hazing" (1942), Homo Sol series #3
- "Super-Neutron" (1941)
- "Not Final!" (1941), Jovians series #1
- "Legal Rites" (1950), novelette
- "Time Pussy" (1942), Probability Zero series
- "Author! Author!" (1964), novelette
- "Death Sentence" (1943)
- "Blind Alley" (1945), Galactic Empire series
- "No Connection" (1948)
- "The Endochronic Properties of Resublimated Thiotimoline" (1948), Thiotimoline series #1
- "The Red Queen's Race" (1949), novelette
- "Mother Earth" (1949), novella, Robot series

== Lost stories ==
In an appendix to The Early Asimov, the author lists the first sixty stories he wrote in the late 1930s and 1940s. In the commentary throughout the book, he notes that eleven of those stories were never sold and were eventually lost. However two of the "lost" stories were found and published decades later (after The Early Asimov had been published).

- "Cosmic Corkscrew", Asimov's first story, was written between 29 May 1937 and 19 June 1938. The story, 9000 words long, was about a man who traveled into the future to find the Earth recently deserted. Due to the quantum nature of time, he could not travel back in time a short distance to find out what happened. Asimov submitted it on 21 June to John W. Campbell, editor of Astounding Science Fiction, who rejected it. The story never sold and was eventually lost.
  Michael A. Burstein paid a tribute to it by writing his own Cosmic Corkscrew [Analog June 1998], in which a fan travels back in time to retrieve the lost manuscript. The short story was nominated for the 1999 Hugo Awards.
- "This Irrational Planet", Asimov's fourth story, was written in August 1938. Thirty-four years later, all Asimov could recall of the story was that the irrational planet was almost certainly Earth, and that it was 3000 words long. Asimov submitted the story to Thrilling Wonder Stories on August 25, and it was rejected on 24 September. It was subsequently rejected by Astounding and five other magazines, never sold, and was eventually lost.
- "The Weapon", Asimov's sixth story, was written in September 1938. It was rejected several times before being accepted by Super Science Stories, appearing in the May 1942 issue under the pseudonym H. B. Ogden. Thirty years later, Asimov had quite forgotten about its publication, and he listed it among his lost stories in The Early Asimov. He discovered its publication while writing his autobiography In Memory Yet Green (1979) and included it in chapter 30 of that book.
- "Paths of Destiny", Asimov's seventh story, was written in October 1938. Asimov submitted it to Astounding on 28 October, but Campbell rejected it as "hackneyed". It never sold and was eventually lost. Thirty-four years later, Asimov could remember nothing about the story.
- "Knossos in its Glory", Asimov's eighth story, was written in November 1938. The story was an attempt to retell the Theseus myth in science fiction terms. Asimov submitted the story to Astounding on 22 November, and it was rejected. He then submitted it to Charles D. Hornig, editor of Science Fiction, on 7 May 1939; Hornig rejected it two days later. It never sold and was eventually lost.
- "The Decline and Fall", Asimov's twelfth story, was written in February 1939. Asimov submitted it to Astounding on 21 February, and it was rejected four days later. The story "made the rounds" as Asimov put it, never sold, and was eventually lost. Thirty-three years later, Asimov could remember nothing about the story.
- "Life Before Birth", Asimov's seventeenth story, was written in the summer of 1939. Asimov submitted it to Unknown on 11 July, and it was rejected eight days later. It was also rejected by Weird Tales, never sold, and was eventually lost. Thirty-three years later, Asimov could remember nothing about "Life Before Birth" except that it was a fantasy story.
- "The Brothers", Asimov's eighteenth story, was written between 11 September and early October. The story was about two brothers, one good and one evil, one of whom was constructing a scientific invention. Asimov submitted it to Astounding on 5 October, and it was rejected six days later. After making the rounds, the story never sold and was eventually lost.
- "The Oak", Asimov's twenty-second story, was written in the summer of 1940. The story was a fantasy about an oak tree that served as an oracle and delivered ambiguous statements. Asimov submitted it to Unknown on 16 July, and it was rejected. Asimov then submitted it to Weird Tales, which also rejected it. The story never sold and was eventually lost.
- "Masks", Asimov's twenty-ninth story, was written on 3 February 1941. Asimov submitted it to Unknown on 10 February, and it was rejected. The story never sold and was eventually lost. Twenty-nine years later, Asimov could remember nothing about "Masks" except that it was a 1500-word fantasy.
- "Big Game", Asimov's thirty-ninth story, was written on 17 November 1941. Campbell wanted to create a category of short-short science fiction tall tales called "Probability Zero" that would serve as a market for beginning writers, and he asked Asimov to write one for him. The 1000-word "Big Game" was Asimov's first effort, and Campbell rejected it. Asimov subsequently submitted "Big Game" to Collier's Weekly in 1944, resulting in another rejection. After expanding the story to 3000 words and retitling it "The Hunted", Asimov submitted it to Thrilling Wonder Stories on 30 October 1946, resulting in yet another rejection; submission of the expanded version to Astounding resulted in still another rejection. After that, both versions of the story disappeared, and Asimov recorded "Big Game" as lost. However, after publication of The Early Asimov, a fan named Matthew Bruce Tepper found a copy of the original version among Asimov's papers at Boston University, and Asimov finally published the story in the anthology Before the Golden Age.

== Reception ==
Lester del Rey recommended the collection, noting that, by design and necessity, it contained "stories the author knows are not his best." He described Asimov's commentary as "so marvelously consistent – and consistently entertaining."
