= Half-Breed (short story) =

- Short story by Isaac Asimov
- Country: United States
- Language: English
- Genre: Science fiction

Publication
- Published in: Astonishing Stories
- Publisher: Popular Publications
- Media type: Magazine
- Publication date: February 1940

Chronology
- Series: Tweenie
—	Half-Breeds on Venus

"Half-Breed" is a science fiction short story by American writer Isaac Asimov. It was first published in the February 1940 issue of Astonishing Stories and reprinted in the 1972 collection The Early Asimov. It was the fifteenth story written by Asimov, and the fourth to be published. At 9000 words, it was his longest published story to date.

"Half-Breed" was written in June 1939, and submitted to (and subsequently rejected by) Amazing Stories and Astounding Science Fiction before being accepted by Frederik Pohl in October for his new magazine Astonishing Stories.

Asimov wrote a sequel to the story, titled "Half-Breeds on Venus".

== Plot summary ==
Dr. Jefferson Scanlon, a struggling scientist, is trying, and failing, to develop a cheap and reliable method of generating atomic power. While he is taking a walk to think over his work, he rescues a nineteen-year-old orphan "Tweenie", the off-spring of human and Martian parents, from a gang of teenage bullies. The Tweenie, Max, had escaped from the orphanage where he was raised following the death of his only friend, a fifteen-year-old Tweenie named Tom. Tweenies are despised and treated as subhuman by the general population, but Scanlon takes pity on Max and invites him into his home. Max has extensively taught himself science from books at the orphanage, and within a week his insight helps Scanlon solve his problem and develop a workable atomic power source. Scanlon decides to formally adopt Max as his son.

A year later, Scanlon has become wealthy and famous. He realizes that Max is lonely for others of his kind, and he adopts a young Tweenie woman named Madeline, along with two younger Tweenie girls from Madeline's orphanage. Scanlon then decides to formally adopt all Tweenies on Earth, and to use his fortune to establish an independent town in Ohio, "Tweenietown", where they can run their own society free from prejudice. Max and the other Tweenies repay Scanlon for his help by assisting him in further scientific developments such as a gravity shield.

Fifty years after the adoption of Madeline and the two girls, Tweenietown is a growing concern, with a population of 1,154. An elderly Scanlon asks a government official for help gaining full civil rights for the Tweenies, arguing that they will eventually supplant humans as the dominant species. After the official leaves, Max informs Scanlon that his efforts are in vain; humans now fear the Tweenies and will eventually try to destroy them. Max also reveals that the Tweenies have secretly built three interplanetary spaceships, hoping to create their own civilization on Venus. Offered the chance to accompany them, Scanlon declines and accepts that the Tweenies have no more need of him.

== Story background ==
Half-Breed is set several centuries in the future: at one point, Scanlon notes with relief that it has been two centuries since a war was last fought on Earth, so there is no risk of his newly invented atomic power source being used as a weapon.

The presence of the Tweenies on Earth is unexplained by Asimov. Max, who is nineteen when Scanlon saves and adopts him, is the oldest Tweenie in the story, which suggests that the existence of the Tweenies is a recent phenomenon. This in turn implies that interplanetary travel is also a recent phenomenon, an implication supported by Scanlon's description of pre-atomic trips to Mars and Venus as "hazardous gambles". Another implication of the Tweenies' presence on Earth is that the native Martians will not allow them to remain on Mars. Those Tweenies who are on Earth were presumably brought there as infants by human spacemen returning from Mars. Their human parents (probably the crew of Earth ships who have traveled to Mars) have abandoned them, and they have become wards of the state, being raised in state-run orphanages.

When Scanlon goes searching for a female Tweenie companion for Max, he only finds one of a suitable age, which implies that the number of Tweenies on Earth at that time is small. Fifty years later, Tweenietown has a population of 1,154, some of which is undoubtedly due to natural increase by the original Tweenie population, and some of which is equally undoubtedly due to the arrival of more orphaned Tweenies from Mars (since Scanlon and Max's discovery of atomic power makes interplanetary travel more common).

In the fifty-one years that pass in the course of the story, the situation for the Tweenies remains unchanged on Earth. The Tweenies lack, as Scanlon notes, political, legal, economic, and social equality with humans (and, for that matter, with native Martians). Human (and Martian) hostility towards the Tweenies seems to be permanently ingrained.

== Notes ==
Asimov wrote "Half-Breed" in June 1939. His new literary agent Frederik Pohl unsuccessfully submitted it to Amazing Stories. Asimov then submitted the story to John W. Campbell of Astounding Science Fiction, who also rejected it. Pohl announced in October his new job as editor of two magazines by purchasing "Half-Breed" for one. It was Asimov's longest story to date at 9,000 words; "Half-Breed" was his first novelette and the first time his name appeared on the cover.

As with his earlier story "The Weapon Too Dreadful to Use", the theme of "Half-Breed" is the prejudice faced by minorities, something Asimov himself was familiar with due to his Jewish heritage. "I kept coming back to this theme very frequently," he wrote in The Early Asimov, "something not surprising in a Jew growing up during the Hitler era." In I. Asimov he wrote, "The undercurrent of genteel anti-Semitism was always there . . . people such as the Catholic priest Father Charles Coughlin and the aviation hero Charles Lindbergh openly expressed anti-Semitic views." However, he was also aware that "prejudice was universal and that all groups who were not dominant, who were not actually at the top of the status chain, were potential victims."

Campbell of Astounding disagreed. Asimov noted in The Early Asimov that Campbell "seemed to me to accept the natural superiority of Americans over non-Americans, and he seemed automatically to assume the picture of an American as one who was of northwest European origin. I cannot say that Campbell was a racist in any evil sense of the term . . . . Nevertheless, he did seem to take for granted, somehow, the stereotype of the Nordic white as the true representative of Man the Explorer, Man the Darer, Man the Victor."

Asimov admitted that by the standards of scientific knowledge in 1939, the possibility that Mars might have a native intelligent race was unlikely, and the possibility that Martians and humans would be interfertile was even more so. "I can only shake my head wearily," he wrote; "I knew better in 1939; I really did. I just accepted science fictional clichés, that's all. Eventually, I stopped doing that." Asimov also noted that "Half-Breed" was "the first story in which I tried to introduce the romantic motif, however light. It had to be a failure. At the time of the writing of this story, I had still never had a date with a girl."
