= Green Patches =

- Short story by Isaac Asimov
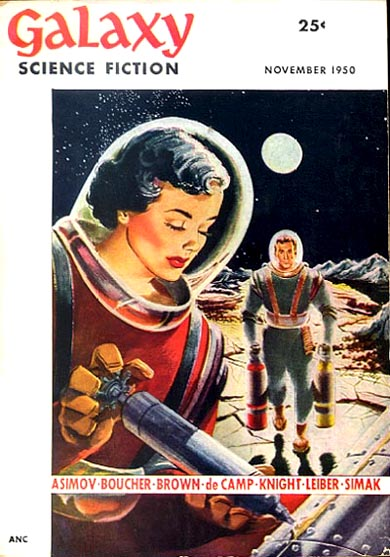
- Country: United States
- Language: English
- Genre: Science fiction

Publication
- Published in: Galaxy Science Fiction
- Publication type: Periodical
- Publisher: Galaxy Publishing
- Media type: Print (Magazine, Hardback & Paperback)
- Publication date: November 1950

"Green Patches" is a science fiction short story by American writer Isaac Asimov. It was first published in the November 1950 issue of Galaxy Science Fiction under the title "Misbegotten Missionary", and reprinted under that title in the 1952 anthology Tomorrow, the Stars. It was retitled "Green Patches" in Asimov's 1969 collection Nightfall and Other Stories.

== Plot summary ==
A human colony ship landed on an unknown planet (later named "Saybrook's Planet"). The ship's captain, Saybrook, analyzed the planet's abundant plant and animal life and discovered that it is all part of a single organism with a unified consciousness. However, that organism perceived the humans (and all the other lifeforms they have brought along) as being "incomplete" and mere "life fragments", because they were not part of the perfect planetary consciousness. In an altruistic attempt to help the humans, the planetary organism decides to make them part of itself; it induces pregnancy in all the colony ship's female animals, and all the offspring born have green patches of fur (alien sense organs) instead of eyes, a sign that they were part of the planetary organism. When Saybrook had the women in his crew examined and confirmed that they were all pregnant, he sent a sub-ether report back to Earth and then destroyed his ship with all aboard.

Later, a research spaceship from Earth lands on Saybrook's Planet to investigate the report by the earlier colony ship. The crew take no chances and incinerate all life around the landing point, while carefully preventing any life from the planet from coming on board (and have an all-male crew for good measure). They confirm Saybrook's report, then set out to return to Earth to recommend that Saybrook's Planet be permanently quarantined. Unknown to the research ship's crew, they carry a stowaway — a part of the planet's fauna that crawled aboard when they temporarily dropped their force fields. The small creature has been specially bred to resemble a length of wiring and go undetected. The planetary organism has never before experienced selfishness and violence and is desperate to "help" the "life fragments" (Earthlings) to become "complete", by joining consciousness with it in blissful unity. If the stowaway manages to reach Earth, it will eventually convert all life there into a single organism with a unified consciousness — and green patches of fur instead of eyes.

The stowaway creature removes a section of wiring from the cockpit and impersonates it, in order to hide. It then psychically examines the minds of the humans and other organisms on the ship and is increasingly disturbed by their chaotic, conflicting existence as individuals. It is revolted by the fact that they show selfishness and competition, instead of altruism and cooperation. The creature is greatly saddened by being disconnected from the planetary consciousness, but takes solace in the fact that it will soon perform its mission and join with all life on Earth. The invasion is thwarted however, when the stowaway is accidentally killed after the research ship lands on Earth; the wiring it was impersonating controlled the ship's airlock doors, and it was incinerated when they were activated. The ship's scientist, aware of the potential threat from Saybrook's Planet, is relieved to return to the anarchy that is Earth.

== Critical response ==
Science fiction author and critic Damon Knight wrote:

"Misbegotten Missionary"...poses a difficult problem, develops it with skill, and solves it, regrettably, by accident; what disappoints me more in the story, which might have been a great one, is that it also suggests a very delicate problem of values, and not only does not solve it — I'll admit this would be too much to ask — but leaves it entirely out of account.

== Story notes ==
Asimov notes in the introduction that this story was (unintentionally) a reworking of the theme from Who Goes There? by John W. Campbell.

"Green Patches" was later included in an early Foundation Series timeline that was published in Thrilling Wonder Stories along with the story The Portable Star.

Asimov returned to the theme of a unified planetary consciousness in his novels Foundation's Edge, Foundation and Earth, and Nemesis.
