= Not Final! =

- Short story by Isaac Asimov
- Country: United States
- Language: English
- Genre: Science fiction

Publication
- Published in: Astounding Science Fiction
- Publication type: Periodical
- Publisher: Street & Smith
- Media type: Print (Magazine, Hardback & Paperback)
- Publication date: October 1941

Chronology
- Series: Jovian Menace
—	Victory Unintentional

"Not Final!" is a science fiction short story by American writer Isaac Asimov, originally published in the October 1941 issue of Astounding Science Fiction, and included in the 1972 collection The Early Asimov. Its sequel, "Victory Unintentional", is a robot story. These are two of the few stories by Asimov to postulate non-human intelligences in the Solar System.

== Plot summary ==
Earth colonists on Ganymede, the largest satellite of Jupiter, have discovered the existence of intelligent life on the planet's surface. They manage to establish communication with the Jovians by means of a "radio-click" code, and exchange scientific information. When the Jovians realise that the humans are not like them, they break off communication with a threat to destroy what they see as inferior beings.

Scientists on Ganymede realize that no possible Jovian ship could leave the surface without utilizing force-field technology, and experimentally determine that said technology cannot be made practical—therefore the Jovians will be unable to carry out their threat. Although the force field can be created, it cannot exist for more than a fraction of a second at the strength needed to contain Earth's air pressure, let alone Jupiter's. The scientist in charge, a brilliant theoretician, predicts this and then proves it with an experiment that ends in an explosion. Nicholas Orloff, the Colonial Commissioner (who had been on Ganymede to assess the threat) reports back to Earth that the danger that had been posed by the Jovians is ended.

Meanwhile, a ship is headed for Ganymede to pick up Orloff and return him to Earth. A conversation between the ship's Captain and a technician reveals that this ship utilizes force-field technology in an ingenious way which the scientists on Ganymede have not thought of. By trial and error the technician discovered that the field explodes, losing an arm and an eye in the process. However he has circumvented this by turning the field on and off at a high frequency, so it is never on long enough to explode, but is never off long enough to lose air.

The ending line, "I imagine he'll be rather pleased" [with the applicability of the new technology], is ironic since the reader knows that this is precisely the reverse of what we know Orloff's (and the rest of the human race's) reaction to the news will be, since this implies that the Jovians will eventually be able to overcome the technical difficulties and emerge from their planet to wage war on humanity.

The story illustrates a tension between the theoretical ("Scientific") attitude and the practical ("Technical") one, exemplified by the prominent scientist claiming that his theory shows the force-field technology to be impossible ("That's final! That's final!"), and mirrored by the technician's account of his methods, and by the story's title.

== Development ==
"Not Final!" is one of Asimov's early short stories, written at the end of his third year writing stories for science fiction magazines.

After selling "Nightfall" in late April 1941, Asimov took a break from writing to study for qualifying examinations to enter the PhD program in chemistry at Columbia University. He failed the exams, and, very disheartened by this, did not return to writing until 24 May, when he began to work on "Not Final!". Asimov submitted "Not Final!" to John W. Campbell on 2 June, and it was accepted on 6 June, but without a bonus. It was published in the October 1941 issue of Astounding Science Fiction, and later included in the collection of his early short stories The Early Asimov (1972).

Asimov wrote a sequel, "Victory Unintentional", in 1942. These two stories are some of the few written by Asimov to include the idea of extra-terrestrial intelligence in the Solar System.
