= No Connection =

- Short story by Isaac Asimov
- Country: United States
- Language: English
- Genre: Science fiction

Publication
- Published in: Astounding Science Fiction
- Publication type: Periodical
- Publisher: Street & Smith
- Media type: Print (Magazine, Hardback & Paperback)
- Publication date: June 1948

"No Connection" is a science fiction short story by American writer Isaac Asimov. It was first published in the June 1948 issue of Astounding Science Fiction and reprinted in the 1972 collection The Early Asimov.

== Background ==
Written in May 1947, "No Connection" was Asimov's first non-Foundation, non-robot series story in more than two years. John W. Campbell of Astounding Science Fiction purchased it that month.

== Plot summary ==
In the Earth of the far distant future, humans have died out and have been replaced, at least in the Americas, by a race descended from bears. Known to themselves as Gurrow sapiens, they live peaceably in communal groupings, trading with each other and sharing communal property, monetary units and duties. Their science has advanced almost to that of pre-atomic age humans. Little is known of other lands on the planet.

Raph, a Gurrow archaeologist, learns of the arrival on the continent's eastern seaboard of an unknown race, apparently descended from chimpanzees, who resemble 'Primate Primeval', the extinct race whose existence he has been trying to prove. Their science is more advanced and they are more war-like.

It is implied that the arrivals may try to invade and colonise the lands occupied by Gurrows, and that they have developed nuclear weapons. Raph suspects that nuclear war may have been the reason why the original primates became extinct.
