= History (short story) =

- Short story by Isaac Asimov
- Country: United States
- Language: English
- Genre: Science fiction

Publication
- Published in: Super Science Stories
- Publisher: Popular Publications
- Media type: Magazine
- Publication date: March 1941

"History" is a science fiction short story by American writer Isaac Asimov. It was first published in the March 1941 issue of Super Science Stories and reprinted in the 1972 collection The Early Asimov.

== Background ==
"History" was written in the first half of September 1940. Asimov submitted the story on 13 September to John W. Campbell of Astounding Science Fiction, who rejected it. He then submitted it to Frederik Pohl, who accepted the story for Super Science Stories on 11 October.

== Plot summary ==
History concerns a Martian scholar named Ullen who is researching Earth's history. A former student named John Brewster tells him that he has just joined Earth's Home Defense in response to the outbreak of war between Earth and Venus. The Martians, being few in number, no longer fight wars, and Ullen finds the whole concept puzzling. Later, in a conversation with an Earthman in a fallout shelter during an air raid, Ullen casually mentions an ancient Martian weapon called a skellingbeg, or fall-apart weapon. The next time Brewster visits, Ullen asks him about it. Brewster takes Ullen to see a physicist named Thorning in Washington, D.C., who questions him about the weapon. Being a historian, Ullen doesn't know the technical details, only that the skellingbeg could make iron, nickel and cobalt objects turn to powder. Thorning is able to pick up one or two clues from Ullen's description, but since the Martians long ago decided that science was a bad idea, they no longer have any scientific texts.

When the war starts going badly for Earth, Brewster confronts Ullen, saying they need more information on the Martian weapon. When Brewster implies that Ullen is holding back his knowledge on purpose to extort money from Earth's government, Ullen is insulted and refuses to say anything more. Ullen finally breaks down when Thorning threatens to have his historical work suppressed. He babbles some half-remembered details about the weapon, and one of Thorning's assistants realizes that Earth's scientists are working on something similar. The clues Ullen provides allow Earth to develop its own version of the skellingbeg and win the war. A grateful Earth government names a war museum after Ullen, much to the Martian's disdain.

== Notes ==
Despite being written at the height of Adolf Hitler's wartime success in September 1940, "History" predicts his defeat, although Asimov expected that he would be exiled like Napoleon.
