= The Hazing =

- Short story by Isaac Asimov
- Country: United States
- Language: English
- Genre: Science fiction

Publication
- Published in: Thrilling Wonder Stories
- Publication type: Periodical
- Publisher: Better Publications
- Media type: Print (Magazine, Hardback & Paperback)
- Publication date: October 1942

Chronology
- Series: Homo Sol Trilogy
The Imaginary	—

"The Hazing" is a science fiction short story by Isaac Asimov. It was first published in the October 1942 issue of Thrilling Wonder Stories and reprinted in the 1972 collection The Early Asimov. Discussing the story in The Early Asimov, the author noted that it is set in the same fictional universe as his earlier stories "Homo Sol" and "The Imaginary", but featured different characters. "The Hazing" was the thirtieth story written by Asimov, and the twenty-eighth to be published. Due to the peculiar workings of the science fiction magazine publishing industry, the story appeared a month before "The Imaginary".

When putting together The Early Asimov, Asimov confessed he was unable to remember writing "The Hazing," or any details of the story, even after reading it.

== Plot summary ==
In the Homo Sol stories, the Galactic Federation has developed psychology into a hard science, with quantitative equations and solutions for behavior. Consequently, master psychologists are important and highly regarded.

A few years after the people of Homo Sol have joined the Galactic Federation, a group of students from Earth arrive to study at Arcturus University. Shortly thereafter, they are kidnapped as an upperclassman's prank (hazing) and deposited on a planet inhabited only by primitive people, who are quarantined until they develop hyperspace travel. According to Federation psychology, the students should panic and embarrass themselves when they are captured. However, by the use of "primitive" psychology the Solarians persuade the natives that they are in fact gods from beyond the stars. When the kidnappers return, they are also captured by the natives, but are rescued by the Earth people.

== Sources ==
- Asimov, Isaac, "The Hazing" in The Early Asimov ISBN 0-385-03979-4.
