= The Magnificent Possession =

- Short story by Isaac Asimov
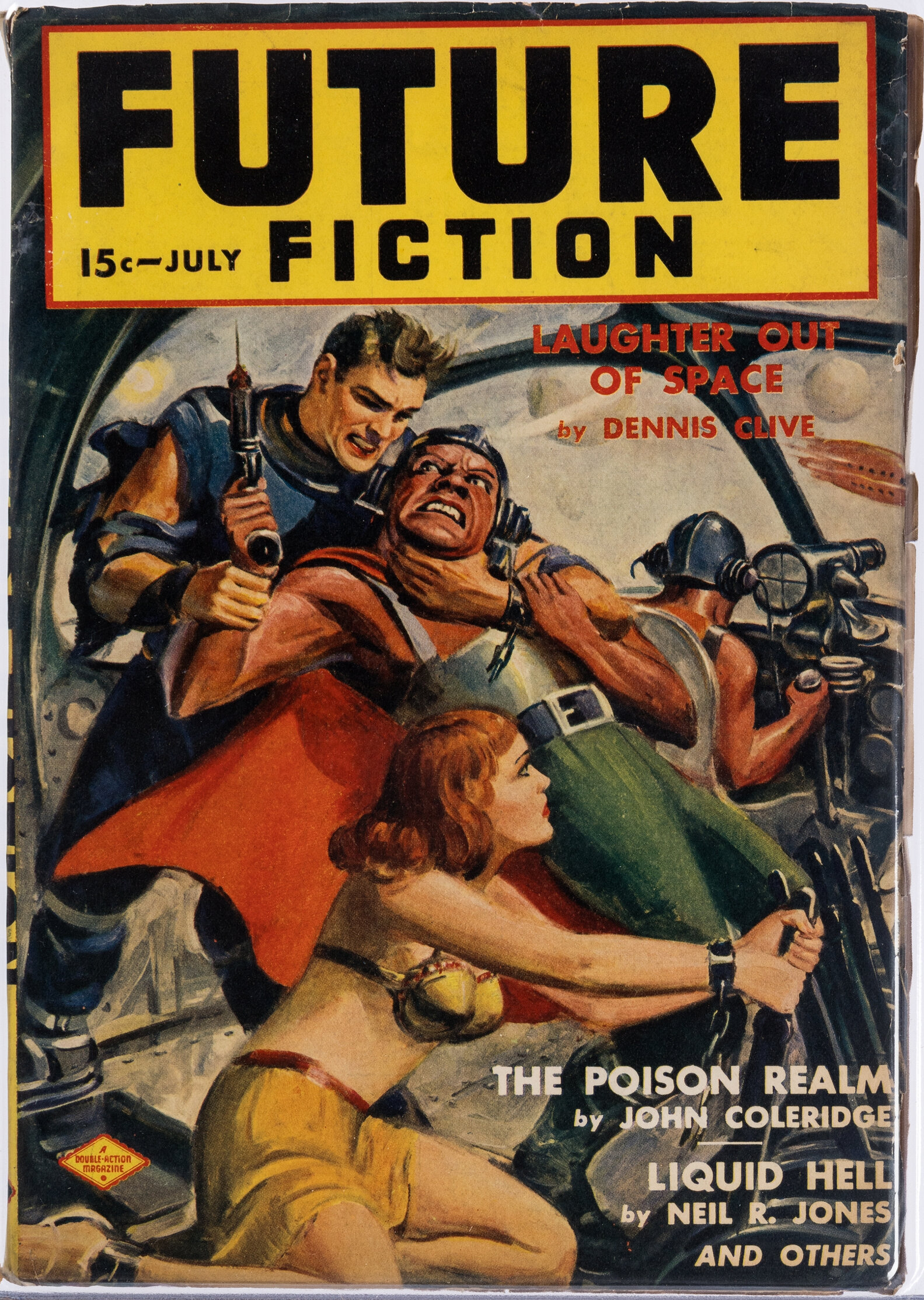
- Country: United States
- Language: English
- Genre: Science fiction

Publication
- Published in: Future Fiction
- Publication type: Periodical
- Publisher: Double Action Magazines
- Media type: Print (Magazine, Hardback & Paperback)
- Publication date: July 1940

"The Magnificent Possession" is a science fiction short story by American writer Isaac Asimov. It was first published in the July 1940 issue of Future Fiction, and reprinted in the 1972 collection The Early Asimov. It was the ninth story written by Asimov, and the seventh to be published. The author recalls that the story, an attempt at humour, was embarrassing to read later, and that he was glad that his long-time editor, John W. Campbell, never saw it, as he would certainly have rejected it.

Asimov was majoring in chemistry at the time he wrote the story in late November 1938. After the story, originally titled "Ammonium", was rejected by Thrilling Wonder Stories, Asimov became discouraged and retired it. When Future Fiction accepted his story "Ring Around the Sun", he dug out "Ammonium" and submitted it as well. The title was changed by Future Fiction's editor, Charles D. Hornig.

== Plot summary ==
Walter Sills, a struggling New York consulting chemist, is developing a method of plating metal with pure ammonium, which would be cheaper than using traditional plating metals such as nickel or chromium despite having an appearance very similar to gold. Despite not having properly tested the plating process, he obtains some publicity for his discovery, which leads him into all sorts of problems with gangsters who want to steal his formula and crooked politicians who seek to exploit him.

He hopes to sell the process to a steel magnate, but discovers at the last moment that the process generates an extremely foul smell which lasts almost indefinitely, making it commercially unviable.

== Bibliography ==
- Asimov, Isaac, "The Magnificent Possession" in The Early Asimov ISBN 0-385-03979-4.
