= Super-Neutron =

- Short story by Isaac Asimov
- Country: United States
- Language: English
- Genre: Science fiction

Publication
- Published in: Astonishing Stories
- Publication type: Periodical
- Media type: Print (Magazine, Hardback & Paperback)
- Publication date: September 1941

"Super-Neutron" is a science fiction short story by American writer Isaac Asimov, originally published in the September 1941 issue of Astonishing Stories, and included in the 1972 collection The Early Asimov.

== Plot summary ==
In the year 2144, a group of four friends who call themselves the Honorable Society of Ananias meet for lunch once a month, during which one of the members tells a story. The story must be a complex and fantastic lie, but one which sounds like the truth. The other three members are free to heckle and attack the supposed veracity of the tale.

At the seventeenth meeting, Gilbert Hayes, a guest, requests that he be allowed to tell a story. His tale is that, fifteen years before, as an astronomer, he discovered that a planet with no gravitational field had entered the Solar System from the region of the south celestial pole and remained undiscovered by other astronomers. Hayes compares the planet to a "super-neutron", and he claims that it is heading for the Sun and will strike in just over an hour, destroying the Sun the way a neutron causes a uranium nucleus to fission.

The story Hayes weaves involves complex astronomical observations and theories, and at the end of the tale, he hands around pieces of exposed film-negative, through which the members gaze into the sky and see - or think they see - a small dark spot against the sun. At 2:09:30 pm Hayes announces that the super-neutron has struck the sun, and that the Earth will be destroyed in eight minutes. He calmly announces the destruction, first of Mercury, then of Venus, and finally counts down the last thirty seconds to the end of the Earth.

When the Earth is not destroyed, Hayes theorizes that this is because the Sun is like a cadmium nucleus among the uranium nuclei of other stars—able to absorb the super-neutron without undergoing fission.

Out of sheer relief, the members vote him in as Perpetual President of the Society, but the narrator has misgivings. He thinks that the story was in fact true and that therefore Hayes should have been disqualified.
