= Death Sentence (short story) =

- Short story by Isaac Asimov
- Country: United States
- Language: English
- Genre: Science fiction

Publication
- Published in: Astounding Science Fiction
- Publisher: Street & Smith
- Media type: Magazine
- Publication date: November 1943

"Death Sentence" is a science fiction short story by American writer Isaac Asimov. It was first published in the November 1943 issue of Astounding Science Fiction and reprinted in the 1972 collection The Early Asimov.

== Plot summary ==
Theo Realo, an eccentric researcher, approaches a psychologist at Arcturus university. His story is that he's spent many years on an obscure out-of-the-way planet and has found evidence that it once formed part of a now-lost Galactic Federation, based on psychology far more advanced than that now known.

Based on his reports, a research group visits the planet to explore it. They discover documents that date back many thousands of years and make a small start in examining them. But Realo insists that the ancient psychologists of the Galactic Federation also set up a world of positronic robots for the purpose of letting them develop their own society and carry out their own research. Realo insists that he has been on this very planet, that the robot society still exists and that he let them examine his spaceship.

It is feared that the robots will develop hyperspace travel themselves, which will pit them against the current Federation. The government will then have no choice but to attack and destroy them – so the robot world is effectively under a death sentence. Realo refuses to let this happen, and sets off to warn the robots. He plans to return to the city where he first met them — a city the robots called New York.

== Notes ==
Having returned to writing after almost a year with "Author! Author!", Asimov finished "Death Sentence" in June 1943 and sold it to John W. Campbell of Astounding Science Fiction in July, which published it in November.
