= Homo Sol =

Short story by Isaac Asimov

- Short story by Isaac Asimov
- Country: United States
- Language: English
- Genre: Science fiction

Publication
- Published in: Astounding Science Fiction
- Publication type: Periodical
- Publisher: Street & Smith
- Media type: Print (Magazine, Hardback & Paperback)
- Publication date: September 1940

Chronology
- Series: Homo Sol Trilogy
—	The Imaginary

"Homo Sol" is a science fiction short story by American writer Isaac Asimov. It was first published in the September 1940 issue of Astounding Science Fiction and reprinted in the 1972 collection The Early Asimov. It deals with the proposed acceptance into a galactic federation of hominid civilizations of the hominids of newly discovered Earth. (Each member civilization is referred to by a prefix denoting its shared "hominidity", followed by the name of its star — hence the title, Homo Sol.)

Together with its two sequels ("The Imaginary" and "The Hazing") which form a 'Homo Sol Trilogy', the story is primarily set in a university environment. "Homo Sol" was the nineteenth story written by Asimov, the eighth to be published, and the second to appear in Astounding, which was then the world's leading science fiction magazine.

== Plot summary ==
In the Homo Sol stories, the Galactic Federation has developed psychology into a hard science, with quantitative equations and solutions for behavior. Consequently, master psychologists are important and highly regarded.

The Solarians (meaning humans, also referred to as Homo Sol) have developed hyperspace travel and landed on a planet of Alpha Centauri, thus qualifying for acceptance into the Galactic Federation of intelligent humanoid species.

Tan Porus, master psychologist at Arcturus University, is invited to join the delegation to be sent to administer the invitation, but sends one of his assistants. The delegation returns in despair; not only have the Solarians refused the invitation, but they exhibit irrational and war-like behavior that contravenes the sacrosanct psychological laws established over millennia by Federation psychologists.

In opposition to his doubting colleagues, Porus insists that the hominids of this new planet are something special: a species susceptible to panic en masse. "What of Kraut's Law," a colleague asks him, "which says it is impossible to panic more than five hominids at a time?" Porus dismisses this with scorn, manipulates the Federation Council into sending him to Earth to demonstrate his thesis, and in a short time broadcasts back the results of his demonstration: "Panic, morons! World-wide panic!" Porus is eventually able to work out the psychological means to convince the Solarians to accept membership in the Federation.

== Notes ==
Asimov wrote "Homo Sol" in December 1939, after becoming certain that he would receive good grades in his first semester as a Columbia University graduate student. In January 1940 it was the second story, after 15 rejections, that John W. Campbell of Astounding Science Fiction purchased from him. While working at his family's candy store, when a customer berated him for inattention, stating that his son earned $50 a week from hard work, Asimov showed his $72 check, the largest in his career; "It was a very satisfactory moment", he later said.

Campbell insisted on rewriting sections of "Homo Sol" to bring the story closer in line with his own racial views. Asimov avoided submitting future stories with alien characters to Astounding. "Homo Sol" also first mentioned the concept of psychology being developed into a mathematically rigorous science, an idea he called psychohistory in his Foundation stories.
