= Half-Breeds on Venus =

Short story by Isaac Asimov

- Short story by Isaac Asimov
- Country: United States
- Language: English
- Genre: Science fiction

Publication
- Published in: Astonishing Stories
- Publication type: Periodical
- Publisher: Popular Publications
- Media type: Print (Magazine, Hardback & Paperback)
- Publication date: December 1940

Chronology
- Series: Tweenie
Half-Breed	—

"Half-Breeds on Venus" is a science fiction short story by American writer Isaac Asimov. Asimov was asked by Frederik Pohl, editor of Astonishing Stories, to write a sequel to his earlier Tweenie story "Half-Breed", and he spent April and May 1940 doing so. He submitted the sequel to Pohl on June 3, and Pohl accepted it on the 14th, running it in the December 1940 issue of Astonishing. Asimov subsequently included the story in his 1972 collection The Early Asimov.

"Half-Breeds on Venus" was the twentieth story written by Asimov, the tenth to be published, the first sequel to an earlier story, and the first to "make the cover", i.e. to be the source of the magazine's cover illustration. At ten thousand words, it was also the longest story Asimov had had published up to that time. In commentary in The Early Asimov, Asimov says that the character of Irene was named after a fellow chemistry student at Columbia University whom he had developed a crush on.

== Plot summary ==
Half-Breeds on Venus begins shortly after the final events in "Half-Breed". The three Tweenie ships have landed on Venus, and over a thousand Tweenies, led by Max Scanlon, emerge onto an upland plateau. As Max is getting on in years, he gives his elder son Arthur the task of preparing the underground settlement where the Tweenies will live, keeping out of sight of the planet's human settlers.

Meanwhile, Arthur's younger brother Henry is exploring Venus and flirting with his girlfriend Irene. The two of them come across a lake hidden within a forest, and see a large amphibian creature rise up from it. The amphibians prove to be friendly, much to Max's puzzlement, since the earlier reports from human explorers indicate that the amphibians are very shy. Max notices that their brain-cases are large, and speculates that they might be intelligent. The Tweenies soon realize that the amphibians (or Phibs, as Henry names them) are touch-telepaths, and they learn to communicate with them.

Several months later, the Tweenies are busy setting up their new underground town below a nearby ridge when a group of human settlers crosses over from the far side of the mountains. The Tweenies hide within their town while the humans establish a farming community a few miles away.

One day, Irene and Henry sneak out of the Tweenie town to visit the Phibs. Henry is able to communicate their problem with the humans, and the Phibs suggest a solution. Accompanied by a group of Phibs, Henry and Irene travel for three days to the Venusian lowlands. There, the Phibs use their telepathic abilities to take control of three large, dangerous twenty-legged reptilian carnivores called Centosaurs.

The two young Tweenies and their escorts return to the plateau at night just as a storm breaks. The human settlers are startled out of their sleep by the screaming Centosaurs, and at the sight of them they all run. After the humans leave, the reptiles go on to destroy the deserted human settlement. Then the Centosaurs break free of the Phibs' control and try to attack them, but Henry and Irene are able to fend them off with their Tonite ray guns until more Tweenies arrive to finish them off. Irene then falls into a swollen river and Henry jumps in after her. The two are rescued by the Phibs.

When Henry recovers, his father congratulates him on his plan. With so many other places to settle on Venus, the humans are unlikely to return soon to a place they think is infested with Centosaurs. When they do finally return, the Tweenies will be ready for them. The story ends with Henry proposing to Irene.
