= The Weapon Too Dreadful to Use =

- Short story by Isaac Asimov
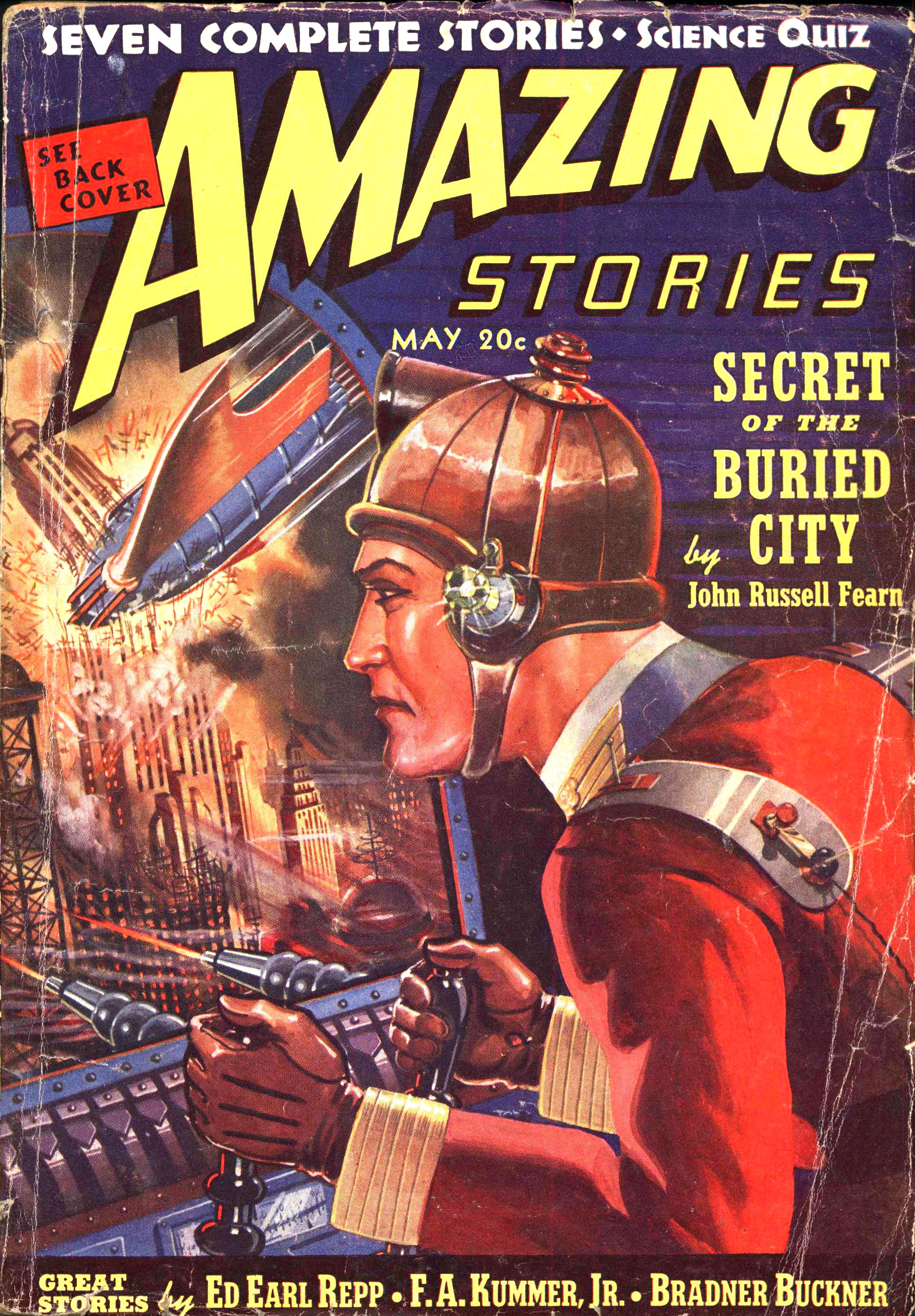
- Country: United States
- Language: English
- Genre: Science fiction

Publication
- Published in: Amazing Stories
- Publication type: Periodical
- Publisher: Ziff-Davis
- Media type: Print (Magazine, Hardback & Paperback)
- Publication date: May 1939

"The Weapon Too Dreadful To Use" is a science fiction short story by American writer Isaac Asimov. It was first published in the May 1939 issue of Amazing Stories and reprinted in the August 1965 issue of Amazing and the 1972 collection The Early Asimov. "The Weapon Too Dreadful to Use" was the eleventh story written by Asimov, and the second to be published.

== Plot summary ==
The people of Earth have colonised Venus, despite the intelligent species native to the planet, who are treated as inferiors with no rights (reminiscent of apartheid and Jim Crow laws on Earth).

One of the Venusians shows his Earthman friend the ruins of an ancient city, where they discover details of an ancient weapon, apparently abandoned millennia before as being too dreadful to actually use. However, as the domination by the colonists increases, elements of the Venusian resistance obtain the weapon and use it on the colonial cities and their population. The weapon works by disconnecting the brain from the mind, and within a short time, the Venusians take back control of their planet from the defenseless colonists.

Earth surrenders and signs a peace treaty with Venus. The Venusians then destroy the weapon.

== Story notes ==
In The Early Asimov, Asimov speculates that Amazing might have bought the story because the magazine needed a story quickly, since "The Weapon Too Dreadful to Use" was accepted in February 1939 and published in the May issue. Frederik Pohl pointed out to Asimov that after the Venusians destroyed the weapon Earth would be free to reconquer Venus. Pohl also pointed out that "the weapon too dreadful to use" had been used. According to Asimov, this caused him to avoid using long, elaborate titles.
