= The Currents of Space =

1952 novel by Isaac Asimov

- Dust-jacket illustration from the first edition
- Author: Isaac Asimov
- Cover artist: George Guisti
- Language: English
- Series: Empire series
- Genre: Science fiction
- Publisher: Doubleday
- Publication date: 1952
- Publication place: United States
- Pages: 217
- Preceded by: The Stars, Like Dust
- Followed by: Pebble in the Sky

The Currents of Space is a science fiction novel by the American writer Isaac Asimov, published in 1952. It is the second (by internal series chronology) of three books labeled the Galactic Empire series, but it was the last of the three to be written. Each occurs after humans have settled many worlds in the galaxy, after the second wave of colonization that went beyond the Spacer worlds, and before the era of decline that was the setting for the original Foundation series.

Asimov stated in 1988 in the "Author's Note" to Prelude to Foundation that book #6 in the Foundation universe chronology was The Currents of Space (1952) and that it was "the first of my Empire novels." Book #7 was The Stars, Like Dust (1951), which was "the second Empire novel."

== Plot summary ==
The story takes place during the process of Trantor's rise from a large regional power to a galaxy-wide empire, unifying millions of worlds. The approximate date is around the year 11,000 AD (originally 34,500 AD, according to Asimov's early 1950s chronology), when the Trantorian Empire encompasses roughly half of the galaxy.

The independent planet Sark rules and exploits the planet Florina which orbits the star located nearest to Sark's sun. Sark derives great wealth from kyrt, a natural plant fiber which is extraordinarily useful and versatile, but which cannot be grown on Sark or on any planet other than Florina. The relationship between the two planets is analogous to that between European imperial powers and their colonies during the 19th century, or the owners and slaves on the cotton plantations of US South: native Florinians are forced to work in kyrt fields and are treated as an inferior race by the resident Sarkites. They are also lighter-skinned than most humans on other worlds, but this is no longer viewed as significant. Memories of racism on Earth have been lost.

Attempts to break the Sark monopoly and grow kyrt on worlds other than Florina have so far been unsuccessful, because kyrt plants grown on other planets do not produce kyrt, only a useless, inferior form of cellulose; no one understands why. So Sark's wealth depends on its colonial dominance of Florina. The government of Trantor naturally wishes to add the two worlds to its growing empire.

The action centers around Rik, a man suffering from gross amnesia and apparent feeble-mindedness. When Rik gradually starts remembering his past, a political crisis involving Sark, Florina, and Trantor ensues. Rik must dodge planetary law-enforcement agents and interstellar spies as he attempts to learn his own history and identity, which the government of Sark is trying to prevent. Ultimately he learns that before losing his memory he was a "Spatio-analyst": a specialized astronaut who gathers samples of the very sparse interstellar gasses in outer space, and determines their composition. (The Spatio-analysts' slogan is "We analyze Nothing".) He also finds out that he had discovered that Florina's sun is about to explode into a nova because it is being exposed to a stream of isolated gaseous carbon atoms flowing through its region of space. The carbon atoms, besides causing Florina's sun to approach nova-stage, are also the reason kyrt grows on Florina: they are causing Florina's sun to emit a special energetic wavelength of light which kyrt plants need in order to bio-synthesize the kyrt fiber. Streams of carbon atoms ("carbon currents") are very rare in space; the reason the plants do not make kyrt when grown on planets orbiting other stars is that Florina is the only known habitable planet whose sun is located in the path of a carbon current.

Because losing Florina would mean losing the principal source of Sark's vast wealth, there was an attempt to use the knowledge to blackmail Sark's rulers. His amnesia was caused by the blackmailer's misuse of a mind-altering device called a "psychic probe" in an attempt to calm him down before he could seek other means to make it public. However, once Rik recovers his memory and reveals the effect of the carbon atoms, the conditions that enable kyrt to grow are understood and can be easily duplicated anywhere.

Rik also learns that he was born on the planet Earth, which is now radioactive. He suggests that Earth was the planet where humanity first originated, but this hypothesis remains controversial.

== Interpretations ==
The book has often been seen as Asimov's comment on race and the USA's past. But with differences of skin-colour reversed:

"The Currents of Space is best seen as Asimov’s take on race relations in the United States as of the early 1950s, before the rise of the Civil Rights movement...

"Asimov doesn’t really bother to hide his reliance on history here, any more than he did in the Foundation series. He even calls our attention to it by making the inhabitants of Florina fair-skinned and red-haired—paler by far than the inhabitants of most other planets, including Sark. To drive home the point, an official of the Interstellar Bureau of Spatio-analysis (IBS) who is trying to locate the missing Spatio-analyst is noted as being from the planet in the galaxy with the darkest average skin color and wooly hair."

"Asimov has the cotton plantations of North America in mind when describing conditions in Florina but has cunningly reversed the complexions of master and servant. On Florina, lighter-skinned people do the work, and darker folk enjoy the wealth which is produced."

== Science ==
When Asimov wrote the book, the cause of novae was unknown. His idea was that it was caused by a star switching from the Proton–proton chain to the CNO cycle. This is not the cause, and stars like the Sun are too small to fuse hydrogen that way. There are real 'currents of space', but they have nothing to do with the matter.

== Reception ==
Galaxy reviewer Groff Conklin described the novel as "one of Asimov's lesser efforts, but still considerably above the average space opera". The magazine's Floyd C. Gale told readers "Don't miss" it and the other Empire novels. Anthony Boucher and J. Francis McComas found The Currents of Space an advance from Asimov's previous work and described it as "first-rate entertainment [that] is so much more adroitly plotted than Asimov's previous ventures in this vein that it stands up as an intricate and constantly surprising spy-suspense story."

== Sources ==
- Tuck, Donald H. (1974). The Encyclopedia of Science Fiction and Fantasy. Chicago: Advent. p. 21. ISBN 0-911682-20-1.
