= Time Pussy =

- Short story by Isaac Asimov
- Country: United States
- Language: English
- Genre: Science fiction

Publication
- Published in: Astounding Science Fiction
- Publication type: Periodical
- Publisher: Street & Smith
- Media type: Print (Magazine, Hardback & Paperback)
- Publication date: April 1942

"Time Pussy" is an early science fiction short story by American writer Isaac Asimov.

== Background ==
"Time Pussy" was the third of three stories Asimov wrote for John W. Campbell for a new category of science fiction tall tales in Astounding Science Fiction called "Probability Zero". Campbell rejected the first two stories, "Big Game" and "First Law", but reluctantly accepted "Time Pussy". Campbell wanted to run the story under a pseudonym, since he wanted to encourage new writers to write "Probability Zero" stories. Asimov chose the name George E. Dale. The story appeared in the April 1942 issue of Astounding and was reprinted under Asimov's name in the 1972 collection The Early Asimov.

== Plot summary ==
The unnamed narrator of "Time Pussy" relates a story he heard as a boy from Old Mac, who had been an asteroid prospector back during the "Rush of '37". Old Mac tells the narrator about some cat-like animals he knew on Pallas that existed in four dimensions: in addition to the usual spatial dimensions, the Pallan cats "stretched somewheres into middle o' next week" (and were thus living precursors of Asimov's fictional chemical compound thiotimoline). The "time pussies" would howl twenty-four hours before seeing a burglar, and digest their meals three hours before eating them. Old Mac tells how some scientists back on Earth were willing to pay a million dollars for the preserved remains of a time pussy, but the animals would decay too quickly after death to be useful. The miners finally came up with the idea of soaking a time pussy in water just before it died, then quickly freezing the water. However, the attempt to preserve the last time pussy failed, because the water froze so quickly it was still warm.
