= Heredity (short story) =

Short story by Isaac Asimov

- Short story by Isaac Asimov
- Country: United States
- Language: English
- Genre: Science fiction

Publication
- Published in: Astonishing Stories
- Publisher: Popular Publications
- Media type: Magazine
- Publication date: April 1941

"Heredity" is a science fiction short story by the American writer Isaac Asimov. Asimov wrote the story, his twenty-third, in August 1940 under the title "Twins". It was rejected by John W. Campbell, editor of Astounding Science Fiction, on 29 August, and accepted by Frederik Pohl on 4 September. It appeared in the April 1941 issue of Astonishing Stories under the title "Heredity" and was reprinted in the 1972 collection The Early Asimov. Heredity was the second Asimov story to receive a cover illustration.

== Plot summary ==
A pair of identical twins, Allen and George Carter, have been separated at birth as part of a twin study to settle the nature versus nurture question. Allen is raised on a highly developed Earth, while George has been raised in the provincial frontier society of Ganymede. On their twenty-fifth birthday, they are introduced to each other and given the task of running the family farm on Mars, where they have to work together in both day-to-day matters and unusual events. They find that they are forced to co-operate and also utilise 'primitive' technology in order to survive a major dust storm. After their initial mutual dislike, they develop a deep friendship.

== Notes ==
After the story appeared, Scott Meredith, then a young science fiction fan named Scott Feldman, wrote to Asimov to point out a flaw in the story: Two characters were introduced in the opening scene, then never heard from again. This led Asimov to pay closer attention to the more mechanical aspects of writing.
