= The Callistan Menace =

- Short story by Isaac Asimov
- Country: United States
- Language: English
- Genre: Science fiction

Publication
- Published in: Astonishing Stories
- Publication type: Periodical
- Publisher: Popular Publications
- Media type: Print (Magazine, Hardback & Paperback)
- Publication date: April 1940

"The Callistan Menace" is a science fiction short story by American writer Isaac Asimov. It first appeared in the April 1940 issue of Astonishing Stories and was reprinted in the 1972 collection The Early Asimov. It was the second science fiction story written by Asimov, and the oldest story of his still in existence.

== Writing and publication ==
Asimov came up with the idea for the story, which he called "Stowaway", after his first meeting with John W. Campbell on 21 June 1938. His first story, "Cosmic Corkscrew", was rejected by Campbell on 23 June. In his autobiography, I, Asimov: A Memoir, the author recalled that Campbell sent him a rejection letter that was so kind and it prompted him to write another story called "Stowaway" ("The Callistan Menace"). He finished the first draft on 28 June, and the final draft on 10 July. He submitted "Stowaway" to Campbell in person during another visit on the 18th. Suspecting that Campbell would reject it, Asimov spent the subway ride home coming up with the plot for a third story, "Marooned off Vesta". This third story was published first in the March 1939 issue of the Amazing Stories.

Campbell did indeed reject "Stowaway", based on the story's "general air of amateurishness, constraint, forcing". On 3 August Asimov submitted the story to Thrilling Wonder Stories. When Thrilling Wonder rejected it, Asimov mailed the story to the offices of Amazing Stories in Chicago, which also rejected it. In the summer of 1939, following the sale of some later stories, Asimov revised "Stowaway", retitled it "Magnetic Death", and again submitted it to Thrilling Wonder Stories and Amazing Stories, and again it was rejected. Later that year, Asimov's friend Frederik Pohl became editor of two new magazines, Astonishing Stories and Super Science Stories. He accepted "Magnetic Death" on 16 November 1939, and it finally appeared in the April 1940 issue of Astonishing Stories under the title "The Callistan Menace". Asimov once described Pohl as "an inveterate title-changer".

As one of Asimov's first creations, "The Callistan Menace" was strongly influenced by Stanley G. Weinbaum, a popular writer during the 1930s. Weinbaum's fiction had a consistent picture of the Solar System that was astronomically correct, at least according to the knowledge available during the 1930s.

== Plot summary ==
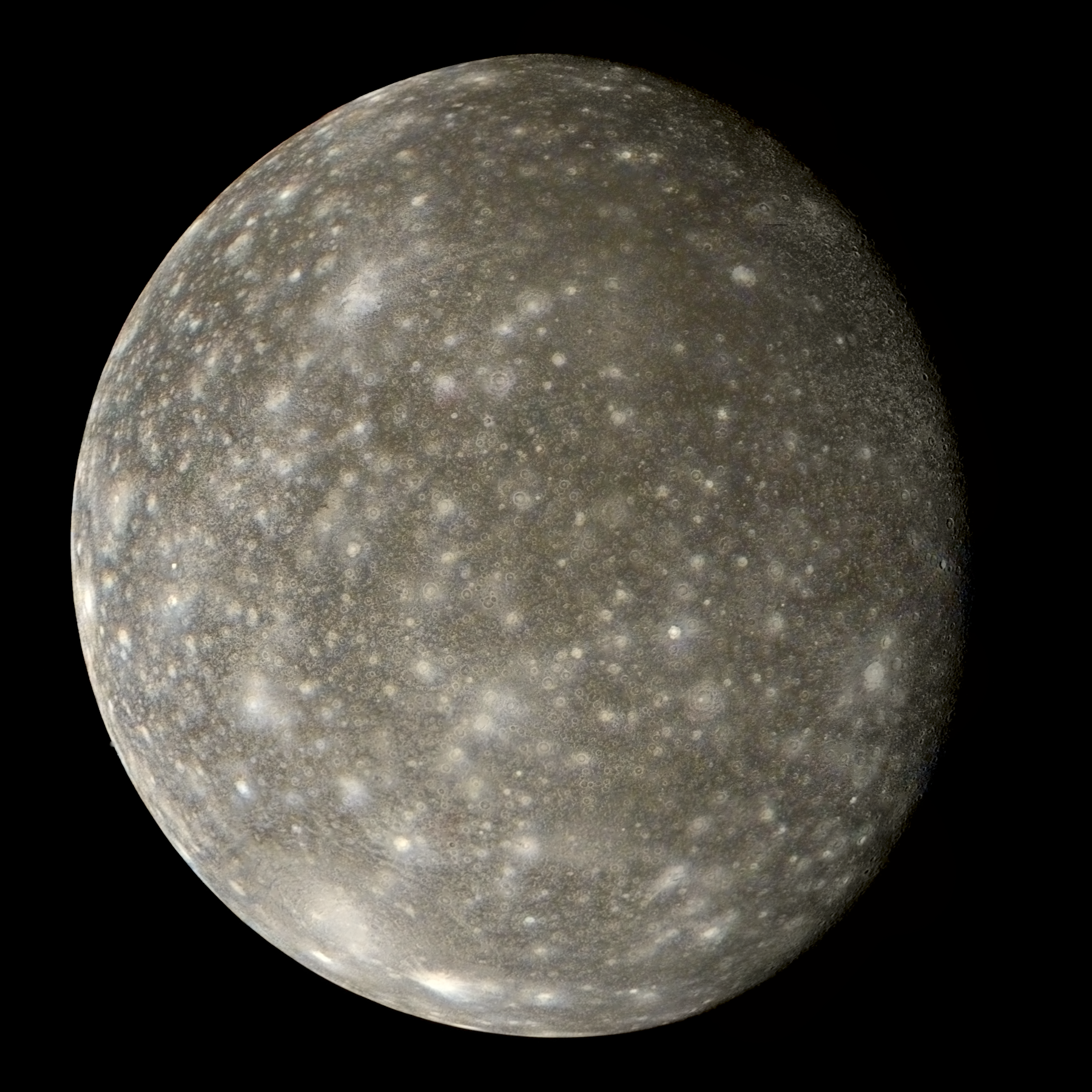
Callisto, where the story takes place.

The scoutship Ceres is assigned to explore the Jovian moon Callisto, outermost of the four Galilean moons. Seven previous ships landed there over a 25-year period, but none returned. Two crewmen discover a stowaway in the supply room, a 13-year-old boy named Stanley Fields who believes in the heroic spacemen and villainous pirates of dime novels. The crew adopts Fields as a mascot, even repairing an obsolete rubber space suit for him, and the stowaway's presence distracts others from the death they fear is likely.

When the Ceres lands on Callisto, the crew find a previous scoutship, the Phobos, still intact. An inspection of the Phobos reveals it to be covered with dried slime, and the remains of its crew are discovered. A horde of four-foot-long creatures resembling slugs emerge from a nearby lake and approaches the Phobos. Two of the Ceres crewmen are overcome by a mysterious affliction, and a third barely makes it back to the ship. The captain of the Ceres realizes that the creatures are using magnetic fields to stun the crewmen, amplified by their steel space suits. Fields volunteers to retrieve the unconscious crewmen in his rubber space suit. He brings the first back, but while retrieving the second he falls victim to an air leak and barely makes it back to the ship. Fields and the unconscious crewmen survive, and Ceres safely departs Callisto.

== Trivia ==
- Stanley Fields was named after Asimov's younger brother, Stanley Asimov.
- The Callistan Menace is the first Asimov story to mention a drink called Martian Jabra Water.
