= Trends (short story) =

- Short story by Isaac Asimov
- Country: United States
- Language: English
- Genre: Science fiction

Publication
- Published in: Astounding Science Fiction
- Publisher: Street & Smith
- Media type: Magazine
- Publication date: July 1939

"Trends" is a science fiction short story by American writer Isaac Asimov. It was first published in the July 1939 issue of Astounding Science Fiction and was reprinted in Great Science Fiction Stories About the Moon (1967) and The Early Asimov (1972).

"Trends" was the tenth story written by Asimov, the third to be published, and the first to appear in Astounding, then the leading science fiction magazine.

== Origins ==
The story had its genesis in research Asimov was conducting on behalf of an academic writing a book on social resistance to technological change. Asimov was particularly struck by a series of articles by Simon Newcomb from the early 20th century arguing that heavier-than-air flight was physically impossible. If there had been resistance to earlier technological change, then Asimov reasoned that there might be social resistance to spaceflight, which was a notion he had never encountered before in a science fiction story. In December 1938, Asimov wrote a story, which he originally titled "Ad Astra", that included resistance to a proposed flight to the Moon, submitting it to Astounding editor John W. Campbell on December 21, 1938. On December 29, 1938 Asimov received a letter from Campbell asking for a story conference. At the conference, Campbell said that he had never read a story that included resistance to space flight, that he liked the idea, and wanted Asimov to rewrite "Ad Astra" to make it central to the story. Asimov brought the revised version to Campbell on January 24, 1939, and Campbell accepted it, publishing it under the title "Trends".

== Plot summary ==
Trends is narrated by Clifford McKenny, looking back from the year 2008, who tells how his boss John Harman was preparing to fly a rocket, the Prometheus, to the Moon in 1973. On July 14, 1973, the day before the scheduled flight, a newspaper called the Clarion denounces Harman as an impious blasphemer for daring to profane the heavens with his rocket ship, and warns that if the government won't stop him, "our enraged citizenry may have to take matters into their own hands". The head of the research institute Harman works for tries to dissuade him, arguing that popular opposition to his work is too strong. Harman refuses to listen.

On the day of the flight, after Harman enters the Prometheus and prepares to launch it, it explodes, killing 28 members of a mostly hostile crowd led by a powerful evangelist named Otis Eldredge. McKenny learns that his coworker Shelton, an Eldredge follower, sabotaged the rocket. The next day, a mob led by an injured Eldredge converges on the hospital where Harman is recuperating, and is barely kept from lynching him. Within a week, a bill passes Congress making rocket experiments a capital crime, and it becomes clear to McKenny that Harman will not be allowed to leave the hospital. He smuggles Harman out and takes him to his uncle's farm in Minnesota.

Within six months, Harman is preparing to try again. McKenny is sent to Chicago to collect the remainder of Harman's personal fortune, and to recruit a handful of trusted engineers. Over the next five years, Harman oversees the construction of the New Prometheus. At the same time, Eldredge's followers gain control of Congress, which establishes the Federal Scientific Research Investigatory Bureau to scrutinize and control all scientific research. Eldredge's death in 1976 does not deter his followers, who continue to restrict scientific research. On March 25, 1978, the FSRIB issues the Easter Edict, forbidding all independent scientific research. A month later, Harman launches the New Prometheus and succeeds in making a free return trajectory around the Moon. Harman lands across the Potomac from Washington, D.C. and before collapsing announces that he has been to the Moon. The news of Harman's feat, combined with Eldredge's absence and growing popular discontent at the extreme policies of the FSRIB, causes a reaction against antiscientism, and Harman is acclaimed as a hero.

== Notes ==
Asimov named the narrator after fellow writer Clifford D. Simak. He cited "Trends" as an example of a successful prediction of the future in a science fiction story. Even though he got the details of the flight itself wrong, Asimov said, he was correct in predicting that there would be popular opposition to a flight to the Moon, and was the first to do so.

The story, written two months after the September 1938 Munich Crisis, mentions a Second World War in 1940. Asimov later wrote that he did not believe Neville Chamberlain's prediction of "Peace for our time": "I estimated that there would be war in a year and a half, and again I was too conservative".

== Sources ==
- Asimov, Isaac, "When Aristotle Fails, Try Science Fiction", Intellectual Digest, December 1971.
- Asimov, Isaac, "Prediction as a Side Effect", Boston Review of Arts, July 1972.
- Asimov, Isaac, "How Easy to See the Future", Natural History, April 1975.
- Asimov, Isaac, In Memory Yet Green, Doubleday, 1979, ISBN 0-385-13679-X.
- Asimov, Isaac, "Trends" in The Early Asimov ISBN 0-385-03979-4.
