= The Stars, Like Dust =

1951 novel by Isaac Asimov

- Dust-jacket from the first edition
- Author: Isaac Asimov
- Cover artist: Whitney Bender
- Language: English
- Series: Empire series
- Genre: Science fiction, Whodunit
- Publisher: Doubleday
- Publication date: February 15, 1951
- Publication place: United States
- Media type: Print (Hardcover/Paperback)
- Pages: 218
- Preceded by: Robots and Empire
- Followed by: The Currents of Space

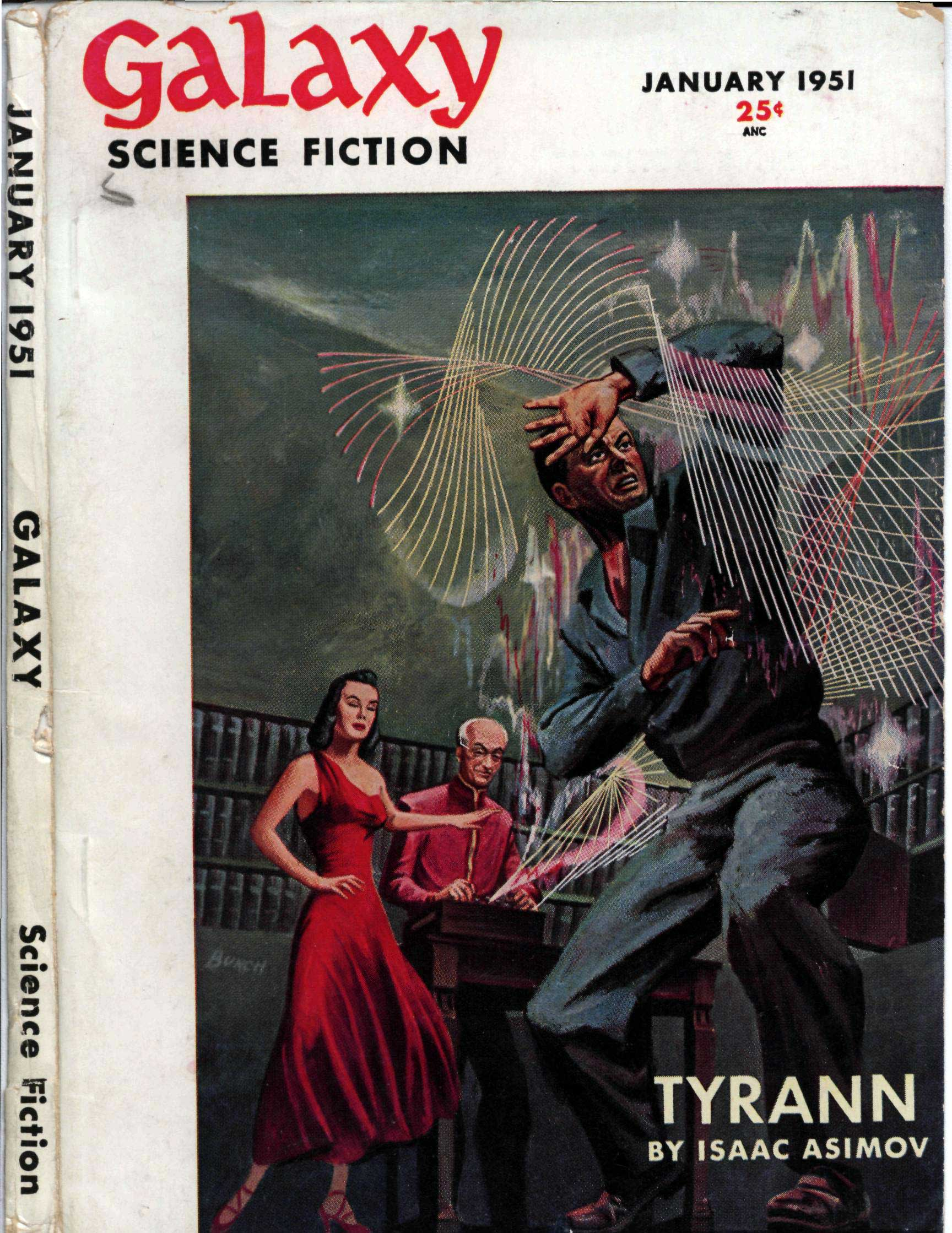
The Stars, Like Dust was serialized in Galaxy Science Fiction as Tyrann in early 1951, and issued in book form around the same time.

The Stars, Like Dust is a 1951 science fiction mystery book by American writer Isaac Asimov.

The book is part of Asimov's Galactic Empire series and takes place before the actual founding of the Galactic Empire, before even Trantor becomes important. At its start, Biron Farrill, the son of the greatest nobleman of the planet Nephelos in the Nebula Kingdoms, is attending the University of Earth and receives the news that his father has been caught conspiring against the Tyranni.

The Tyranni, who come from the planet Tyrann, rule a minor empire of 50 planets near the Horsehead Nebula. Tyrann suppressed science and space navigation training in the kingdoms to help maintain control over its subject worlds. The ruler of Tyrann in the story is called the "Khan," suggesting that Asimov took the Mongol dominion over the Russian principalities as a model, much as he used the declining Roman Empire for his Foundation series. (See the "Golden Horde" for the real-world history that Asimov drew upon and adapted.)

Asimov once called it his "least favorite novel."

== Publication history ==
First published with the title Tyrann in Galaxy magazine, it was serialised in three parts in the January, February, and March 1951 issues. It was published as a novel on February 15 of that year by Doubleday with the title The Stars, Like Dust. It was first published as a paperback in 1954 with the title The Rebellious Stars: however, this version of the story was heavily cut without Asimov's permission and was bound together with An Earth Gone Mad by Roger Dee.

== Plot ==
Biron Farrill, about to complete studies at the University of Earth, is told by Sander Jonti that his father, a rich planetary leader who is known as Lord Rancher of Widemos, has been arrested and killed by the Tyranni and that his own life may be in danger. On Jonti's advice, he travels to Rhodia, the strongest of the conquered planets. There, from the Director of Rhodia's cousin Gillbret, he hears rumours of a world on which rebellion against the Tyranni is secretly being plotted.

Escaping with Artemisia oth Hinriad, the daughter of the Director of Rhodia, and her uncle Gillbret in a Tyranni spaceship, they travel to the planet Lingane. It is not part of the Tyranni conquests but maintains "peaceful" relations with them.

There, they meet the Autarch of Lingane, who is revealed to be Sander Jonti, the man who sent Farrill to Rhodia from Earth, who seems to possess knowledge of a rebellion world. With him and his followers, the group travel to the heart of the Horsehead Nebula as they believe that for any rebellion world to exist and not be known to the Tyranni, it must be located in a place like the Horsehead Nebula.

The Tyranni spaceship that was stolen by Farrill is being tracked by a fleet of Tyranni vessels led by Simok Aratap, the Tyrannian Commissioner. With him is the Director, who is shown to be nervous about the well-being of his daughter and his brother. They keep themselves at a distance for fear of discovery until Farrill lands on one planet in the heart of the nebula.

The Autarch believes that the planet is the rebellion world. However, there is no sign of life anywhere. When the Autarch and Farrill leave the spaceship, apparently to set up a radio transmitter, Farrill faces the Autarch and accuses him of getting his father killed at the hands of the Tyranni. The Autarch affirms the accusation, and Farrill adds that the Autarch feared his father's growing reputation and so caused Farrill's father's death.

In a fight, Farrill subdues the Autarch with help from the Autarch's aide, Tedor Rizzet, who reveals that he is ashamed of the Autarch for killing a great man like Farrill's father. Later, as Farrill and Rizzet try to explain everything to the rest of the crew they picked up from Lingane, the Tyranni fleet arrives and takes them prisoner. Aratap interrogates Farrill, Artemisia, Gillbret, and Rizzet to ascertain the co-ordinates of the rebellion world, but they do not know where it is. However, the Autarch reveals the information to Aratap. Rizzet kills the Autarch with a blaster in anger.

While Aratap interrogates Farrill, Gillbret manages to escape to the engine room of the spaceship and short the hyperatomics. Farrill, realizing the danger, manages to contact Aratap. The engines are repaired, but Gillbret is injured and later dies.

The space jump is made with the co-ordinates given to them by the late Autarch. However, they find a planetless system with only a white-dwarf star. Aratap lets Farrill and the others go, believing that there is no rebellion world. Aratap makes it clear that he will never be chosen as Director. Biron and Artemisia are allowed to marry.

A rebellion is indeed in the making, on Rhodia itself; the Director is its leader, who deliberately took on the persona of a nervous and timid old man to throw off suspicion. The Director, a collector of ancient documents, has searched for and has found one that will help a future empire, likely Trantor, govern the galaxy. The document is the United States Constitution.

== Reception ==
Asimov noted in his autobiography that the genesis of the Constitution subplot lay with H. L. Gold, the editor of Galaxy magazine. Asimov felt that Gold's judgment was at fault by attributing too much power to the Constitution as a document. Asimov later considered the premise highly improbable and became annoyed at Gold for having persuaded him to insert the subplot into the novel. Asimov once called it his "least favorite novel."

Galaxy reviewer Groff Conklin termed the novel "a first-rate piece of imaginative story-telling". The magazine's Floyd C. Gale told readers "Don't miss" it and the other Empire novels. In Astounding Science Fiction, Villiers Gerson declared the novel successful despite its "unidimensional" characters because of "Asimov's skill as a story-teller of suspense." The New York Times found the novel "a rousing adventure story of the remote future."

Reviewer Jane Fowler noted, "Making the re-discovery of the United States Constitution into the climax of the plot implies that the space civilization depicted is going to take up this Constitution as a model for building a new political structure, that the "space feudalism" which dominates the political system depicted in the book will be transformed into some kind of a federal, representative democracy. That could have worked fine if this was a stand-alone novel. As part of a series, it does not work because we know that galactic civilization is not going to develop in this way. Trantor will expand and expand, until the entire galaxy is included in its empire. Trantor and its empire have many points in their favor, but it is not a democratic federation. So, the re-discovery of the US Constitution led nowhere, it did not shape a new political reality, and in the end probably ended up right back in a collection of old documents. Of course, the fact is that when Asimov wrote this he probably did not yet fully realize that this was going to be an integral part of a comprehensive long series."
