= Ring Around the Sun (short story) =

Short story by Isaac Asimov

- Short story by Isaac Asimov
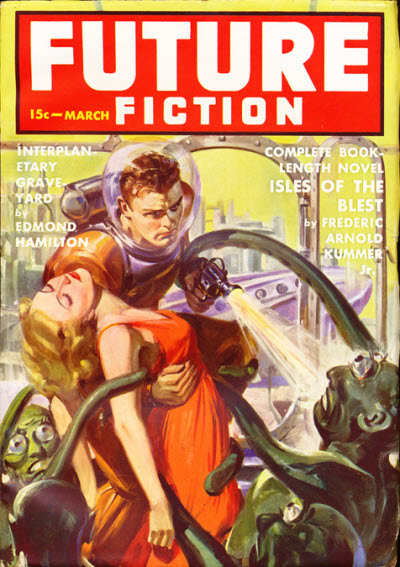
- Country: United States
- Language: English
- Genre: Science fiction

Publication
- Published in: Future Fiction
- Publication type: Periodical
- Publisher: Double Action Magazines
- Media type: Print (Magazine, Hardback & Paperback)
- Publication date: March 1940

"Ring Around the Sun" is a science fiction short story by American writer Isaac Asimov. It was first published in the March 1940 issue of Future Fiction and reprinted in the 1972 collection The Early Asimov. "Ring Around the Sun" was the fifth story Asimov wrote, and also the fifth to be published.

"Ring Around the Sun" was written in the latter half of August 1938, and submitted in person to John W. Campbell, editor of Astounding Science Fiction, on 30 August. When Campbell rejected it, Asimov then submitted it to Thrilling Wonder Stories; after rejection by Thrilling Wonder, it was accepted by Charles D. Hornig of Future Fiction on 5 February 1939. When Asimov wrote the story, he intended it to be the first of a series featuring the two protagonists, Jimmy Turner and Roy Snead. By the time the story appeared in print, however, he had lost interest in the characters. He later created another pair of characters, Powell and Donovan, who would be featured in a series of stories.

== Plot ==
Turner and Snead are the two (self-declared) best pilots with United Space Mail. They are given the task of piloting a new ship, the Helios, on a mail run from Earth to Venus. The Helios has been fitted with a new force field that allows it to deflect solar radiation around itself, so it can safely pass within twenty million miles of the Sun, cutting the length of the trip from the usual six months to two.

The field engages automatically as the ship approaches the Sun, but the two men discover to their dismay that in the absence of solar radiation, the temperature on the ship keeps dropping. The Deflection Field remains on until they leave the Sun's vicinity; by then, the temperature has fallen to minus forty degrees Fahrenheit.

When Turner and Snead finally reach Venus, they are furious and threaten to assault their manager. The latter explains that if they had read the written instructions he gave them, they would have known that they could adjust the intensity of the Deflection Field, thus allowing some solar radiation through and keeping the ship's internal temperature at near-normal.
