= Isaac Asimov short stories bibliography =

This is a list of short stories by American writer Isaac Asimov. Asimov is principally known for his science fiction, but he also wrote mystery and fantasy stories.

This list includes Asimov's Foundation short stories, which were later collected into three novels known as the Foundation Trilogy.

== Published stories ==
In this table, "year" refers to the year of publication, and in the case of magazines means the cover date (which is not always the year when the magazine actually appeared on sale). Alternative titles appear in brackets. (384 stories and poems appear on this list.)

Story	Year	Collected in	First published
"Marooned off Vesta"	1939	Asimov's Mysteries; The Best of Isaac Asimov; The Asimov Chronicles: Fifty Years of Isaac Asimov; The Complete Stories: Ring Around the Sun and Other Stories	Amazing Stories, March 1939
"The Weapon Too Dreadful to Use"	1939	The Early Asimov; The Complete Stories: Ring Around the Sun and Other Stories	Amazing Stories, May 1939
"Trends"	1939	The Early Asimov; The Complete Stories: Ring Around the Sun and Other Stories	Astounding Science Fiction, July 1939
"Half-Breed"	1940	The Early Asimov; The Complete Stories: Ring Around the Sun and Other Stories	Astonishing Stories, February 1940
"Ring Around the Sun"	1940	The Early Asimov; The Complete Stories: Ring Around the Sun and Other Stories	Future Fiction, March 1940
"The Callistan Menace"	1940	The Early Asimov; The Complete Stories: Ring Around the Sun and Other Stories	Astonishing Stories, April 1940
"The Magnificent Possession"	1940	The Early Asimov; The Complete Stories: Ring Around the Sun and Other Stories	Future Fiction, July 1940
"Robbie" (also as "Strange Playfellow")	1940	I, Robot; The Complete Robot; The Asimov Chronicles: Fifty Years of Isaac Asimov; Robot Visions	Super Science Stories, September 1940
"Homo Sol"	1940	The Early Asimov; The Complete Stories: Ring Around the Sun and Other Stories	Astounding Science Fiction, September 1940
"Half-Breeds on Venus"	1940	The Early Asimov; The Complete Stories: Ring Around the Sun and Other Stories	Astonishing Stories, December 1940
"History"	1941	The Early Asimov; The Complete Stories: Ring Around the Sun and Other Stories	Super Science Stories, March 1941
"The Secret Sense"	1941	The Early Asimov; The Complete Stories: Ring Around the Sun and Other Stories	Cosmic Stories, March 1941
"Heredity"	1941	The Early Asimov; The Complete Stories: Ring Around the Sun and Other Stories	Astonishing Stories, April 1941
"Reason"	1941	I, Robot; The Complete Robot; Robot Visions	Astounding Science Fiction, April 1941
"Liar!"	1941	I, Robot; The Complete Robot; Robot Visions	Astounding Science Fiction, May 1941
"Nightfall"	1941	Nightfall and Other Stories; The Best of Isaac Asimov; The Edge of Tomorrow; The Asimov Chronicles: Fifty Years of Isaac Asimov; The Complete Stories, Volume 1	Astounding Science Fiction, September 1941
"Super-Neutron"	1941	The Early Asimov; The Complete Stories: Ring Around the Sun and Other Stories	Astonishing Stories, September 1941
"Not Final!"	1941	The Early Asimov; The Complete Stories, Volume 2	Astounding Science Fiction, October 1941
"Christmas on Ganymede"	1942	The Early Asimov; The Complete Stories: Ring Around the Sun and Other Stories	Startling Stories, January 1942
"Robot AL-76 Goes Astray"	1942	The Rest of the Robots; The Complete Robot	Amazing Stories, February 1942
"Runaround"	1942	I, Robot; The Complete Robot; The Asimov Chronicles: Fifty Years of Isaac Asimov; Robot Visions	Astounding Science Fiction, March 1942
"Black Friar of the Flame"	1942	The Early Asimov; The Complete Stories: Ring Around the Sun and Other Stories	Planet Stories, Spring 1942
"Time Pussy"	1942	The Early Asimov; The Complete Stories: Ring Around the Sun and Other Stories	Astounding Science Fiction, April 1942 (under the pseudonym George E. Dale)
"Foundation" (also as "The Encyclopedists")	1942	Foundation	Astounding Science Fiction, May 1942
"The Weapon"	1942	In Memory Yet Green	Super Science Stories, May 1942 (under pseudonym H. B. Ogden)
"Bridle and Saddle" (also as "The Mayors")	1942	Foundation	Astounding Science Fiction, June 1942
"Victory Unintentional"	1942	The Rest of the Robots; The Complete Robot	Super Science Stories, August 1942
"The Hazing"	1942	The Early Asimov; The Complete Stories, Volume 2	Thrilling Wonder Stories, October 1942
"The Imaginary"	1942	The Early Asimov; The Complete Stories: Ring Around the Sun and Other Stories	Super Science Stories, November 1942
"Death Sentence"	1943	The Early Asimov; The Asimov Chronicles: Fifty Years of Isaac Asimov; The Complete Stories, Volume 2	Astounding Science Fiction, November 1943
"Catch That Rabbit"	1944	I, Robot; The Complete Robot; The Asimov Chronicles: Fifty Years of Isaac Asimov	Astounding Science Fiction, February 1944
"The Big and the Little" (also as "The Merchant Princes")	1944	Foundation	Astounding Science Fiction, August 1944
"The Wedge" (also as "The Traders")	1944	Foundation	Astounding Science Fiction, October 1944
"Blind Alley"	1945	The Early Asimov; The Asimov Chronicles: Fifty Years of Isaac Asimov; The Complete Stories, Volume 2	Astounding Science Fiction, March 1945
"Dead Hand" (also as "The General")	1945	Foundation and Empire	Astounding Science Fiction, April 1945
"Escape!" (also as "Paradoxical Escape")	1945	I, Robot; The Complete Robot	Astounding Science Fiction, August 1945
"The Mule"	1945	Foundation and Empire	Astounding Science Fiction, November 1945 and December 1945
"Evidence"	1946	I, Robot; The Complete Robot; The Asimov Chronicles: Fifty Years of Isaac Asimov; Robot Visions; The Complete Stories, Volume 2	Astounding Science Fiction, September 1946
"Little Lost Robot"	1947	I, Robot; The Complete Robot; Robot Dreams; The Asimov Chronicles: Fifty Years of Isaac Asimov; Robot Visions	Astounding Science Fiction, March 1947
"Now You See It—" (also as "Search by the Mule")	1948	Second Foundation	Astounding Science Fiction, January 1948
"The Endochronic Properties of Resublimated Thiotimoline"	1948	Only a Trillion; The Early Asimov	Astounding Science Fiction, March 1948
"No Connection"	1948	The Early Asimov; The Asimov Chronicles: Fifty Years of Isaac Asimov; The Complete Stories: Ring Around the Sun and Other Stories	Astounding Science Fiction, June 1948
"The Red Queen's Race"	1949	The Early Asimov; The Asimov Chronicles: Fifty Years of Isaac Asimov; The Complete Stories, Volume 2	Astounding Science Fiction, January 1949
"Mother Earth"	1949	The Early Asimov; The Complete Stories: Mother Earth and Other Stories	Astounding Science Fiction, May 1949
"—And Now You Don't" (also as "Search by the Foundation")	1949–1950	Second Foundation	Astounding Science Fiction, November 1949, December 1949 and January 1950
"The Little Man on the Subway" (co-written with Frederik Pohl)	1950	The Early Asimov; The Complete Stories: Ring Around the Sun and Other Stories	Fantasy Book, vol. 1 no. 6 (January 1950)
"The Evitable Conflict"	1950	I, Robot; The Complete Robot; Robot Visions	Astounding Science Fiction, June 1950
"Legal Rites" (co-written with Frederik Pohl)	1950	The Early Asimov; The Complete Stories: Ring Around the Sun and Other Stories	Weird Tales, September 1950
"Darwinian Pool Room"	1950	Buy Jupiter and Other Stories; The Complete Stories: Mother Earth and Other Stories	Galaxy Science Fiction, October 1950
"Green Patches" (also as "Misbegotten Missionary")	1950	Nightfall and Other Stories; The Asimov Chronicles: Fifty Years of Isaac Asimov; The Complete Stories, Volume 1	Galaxy Science Fiction, November 1950
"Day of the Hunters"	1950	Buy Jupiter and Other Stories; The Complete Stories, Volume 2	Future Combined With Science Fiction Stories, November 1950
"Satisfaction Guaranteed"	1951	Earth Is Room Enough; The Rest of the Robots; The Complete Robot; The Complete Stories, Volume 1	Amazing Stories, April 1951
"Hostess"	1951	Nightfall and Other Stories; Robot Dreams; The Complete Stories, Volume 1	Galaxy Science Fiction, May 1951
"Breeds There a Man...?"	1951	Through a Glass, Clearly; Nightfall and Other Stories; The Edge of Tomorrow; Robot Dreams; The Asimov Chronicles: Fifty Years of Isaac Asimov; The Complete Stories, Volume 1	Astounding Science Fiction, June 1951
"The Psychohistorians"	1951	Foundation	Foundation (Gnome Press, 1951)
"In a Good Cause—"	1951	Nightfall and Other Stories; The Complete Stories, Volume 1	New Tales of Space and Time (Henry Holt & Co., 1951)
"C-Chute"	1951	Through a Glass, Clearly; Nightfall and Other Stories; The Best of Isaac Asimov; The Complete Stories, Volume 1	Galaxy Science Fiction, October 1951
"Shah Guido G."	1951	Buy Jupiter and Other Stories; The Complete Stories: Mother Earth and Other Stories	Marvel, November 1951
"The Fun They Had"	1951	Earth Is Room Enough; The Best of Isaac Asimov; The Best Science Fiction of Isaac Asimov; The Asimov Chronicles: Fifty Years of Isaac Asimov; The Complete Stories, Volume 1	Boys' and Girls' Page, December 1951
"Youth"	1952	The Martian Way and Other Stories; The Complete Stories: Mother Earth and Other Stories	Space Science Fiction, May 1952
"What If—"	1952	Nightfall and Other Stories; The Complete Stories, Volume 1	Fantastic, Summer 1952
"The Martian Way"	1952	The Martian Way and Other Stories; The Best of Isaac Asimov; Robot Dreams; The Asimov Chronicles: Fifty Years of Isaac Asimov; The Complete Stories, Volume 2	Galaxy Science Fiction, November 1952
"The Deep"	1952	The Martian Way and Other Stories; The Best of Isaac Asimov; The Complete Stories, Volume 2	Galaxy Science Fiction, December 1952
"Button, Button"	1953	Buy Jupiter and Other Stories; The Complete Stories: Mother Earth and Other Stories	Startling Stories, January 1953
"The Monkey's Finger"	1953	Buy Jupiter and Other Stories; The Complete Stories, Volume 2	Startling Stories, February 1953
"Nobody Here But—"	1953	Nightfall and Other Stories; The Complete Stories, Volume 1	Star Science Fiction Stories (Ballantine Books, February 1953)
"Sally"	1953	Nightfall and Other Stories; The Complete Robot; Robot Dreams; The Asimov Chronicles: Fifty Years of Isaac Asimov; The Complete Stories, Volume 1	Fantastic, May–June 1953
"Flies"	1953	Nightfall and Other Stories; The Best Science Fiction of Isaac Asimov; The Complete Stories, Volume 1	The Magazine of Fantasy and Science Fiction, June 1953
"Kid Stuff"	1953	Earth Is Room Enough; The Complete Stories, Volume 1	Beyond Fantasy Fiction, September 1953
"Belief"	1953	Through a Glass, Clearly; The Winds of Change and Other Stories; The Edge of Tomorrow	Astounding Science Fiction, October 1953
"The Micropsychiatric Applications of Thiotimoline"	1953	Only a Trillion	Astounding Science Fiction, December 1953
"Everest"	1953	Buy Jupiter and Other Stories; The Complete Stories: Mother Earth and Other Stories	Universe Science Fiction, December 1953
"Sucker Bait"	1954	The Martian Way and Other Stories; The Complete Stories: Mother Earth and Other Stories	Astounding Science Fiction, February 1954 and March 1954
"The Pause"	1954	Buy Jupiter and Other Stories; The Complete Stories: Mother Earth and Other Stories	Time to Come (Farrar, Straus and Young, April 1954)
"The Immortal Bard"	1954	Earth Is Room Enough; The Best Science Fiction of Isaac Asimov; The Complete Stories, Volume 1	Universe Science Fiction, May 1954
"The Foundation of S.F. Success"	1954	Earth Is Room Enough; The Best Science Fiction of Isaac Asimov; The Complete Stories, Volume 1	The Magazine of Fantasy and Science Fiction, October 1954
"Let's Not"	1954	Buy Jupiter and Other Stories; The Complete Stories: Mother Earth and Other Stories	Boston University Graduate Journal, December 1954
"It's Such a Beautiful Day"	1955	Through a Glass, Clearly; Nightfall and Other Stories; The Best Science Fiction of Isaac Asimov; The Complete Stories, Volume 1	Star Science Fiction Stories No.3 (Ballantine Books, January 1955)
"The Singing Bell"	1955	Asimov's Mysteries; The Complete Stories, Volume 2	The Magazine of Fantasy and Science Fiction, January 1955
"Question"	1955	—	Computers and Automation, March 1955
"Risk"	1955	The Rest of the Robots; The Complete Robot	Astounding Science Fiction, May 1955
"The Last Trump"	1955	Earth Is Room Enough; The Complete Stories, Volume 1	Fantastic Universe, June 1955
"Franchise"	1955	Earth Is Room Enough; Robot Dreams; The Best Science Fiction of Isaac Asimov; The Asimov Chronicles: Fifty Years of Isaac Asimov; The Complete Stories, Volume 1	If: Worlds of Science Fiction, August 1955
"The Talking Stone"	1955	Asimov's Mysteries; The Complete Stories, Volume 2	The Magazine of Fantasy and Science Fiction, October 1955
"The Portable Star"	1955	—	Thrilling Wonder Stories, Winter 1955
"Dreamworld"	1955	Opus 100; The Best Science Fiction of Isaac Asimov	The Magazine of Fantasy and Science Fiction, November 1955
"Dreaming Is a Private Thing"	1955	Earth Is Room Enough; The Best Science Fiction of Isaac Asimov; The Complete Stories, Volume 1	The Magazine of Fantasy and Science Fiction, December 1955
"The Message"	1956	Earth Is Room Enough; The Complete Stories, Volume 1	The Magazine of Fantasy and Science Fiction, February 1956
"The Dead Past"	1956	Earth Is Room Enough; The Best of Isaac Asimov; The Edge of Tomorrow; The Best Science Fiction of Isaac Asimov; The Complete Stories, Volume 1	Astounding Science Fiction, April 1956
"Hell-Fire"	1956	Earth Is Room Enough; The Complete Stories, Volume 1	Fantastic Universe, May 1956
"Living Space"	1956	Earth Is Room Enough; The Complete Stories, Volume 1	The Original Science Fiction Stories, May 1956
"What's in a Name?" (also as "Death of a Honey-Blonde")	1956	Asimov's Mysteries; The Complete Stories: Mother Earth and Other Stories	The Saint Detective Magazine, June 1956
"The Dying Night"	1956	Nine Tomorrows; Asimov's Mysteries; The Best of Isaac Asimov; The Complete Stories, Volume 1	The Magazine of Fantasy and Science Fiction, July 1956
"Someday"	1956	Earth Is Room Enough; The Complete Robot; Robot Visions; The Complete Stories, Volume 1	Infinity Science Fiction August 1956
"Each an Explorer"	1956	Buy Jupiter and Other Stories; The Complete Stories, Volume 2	Future #30 (August 1956)
"Pâté de Foie Gras"	1956	Asimov's Mysteries; Only a Trillion; The Edge of Tomorrow; The Complete Stories, Volume 2	Astounding Science Fiction, September 1956
"The Watery Place"	1956	Earth Is Room Enough; The Complete Stories, Volume 1	Satellite Science Fiction, October 1956
"First Law"	1956	The Rest of the Robots; The Complete Robot	Fantastic Universe, October 1956
"Gimmicks Three" (also as "The Brazen Locked Room")	1956	Earth Is Room Enough; The Complete Stories, Volume 1	The Magazine of Fantasy and Science Fiction, November 1956
"The Last Question"	1956	Nine Tomorrows; Opus 100; The Best of Isaac Asimov; The Edge of Tomorrow; Robot Dreams; The Best Science Fiction of Isaac Asimov; The Asimov Chronicles: Fifty Years of Isaac Asimov; The Complete Stories, Volume 1	Science Fiction Quarterly, November 1956
"Jokester"	1956	Earth Is Room Enough; Robot Dreams; The Best Science Fiction of Isaac Asimov; The Complete Stories, Volume 1	Infinity Science Fiction, December 1956
"Strikebreaker" (also as "Male Strikebreaker")	1957	Nightfall and Other Stories; Robot Dreams; The Best Science Fiction of Isaac Asimov; The Complete Stories, Volume 1	The Original Science Fiction Stories, January 1957
"The Dust of Death"	1957	Asimov's Mysteries; The Complete Stories: Mother Earth and Other Stories	Venture Science Fiction, January 1957
"Let's Get Together"	1957	The Rest of the Robots; The Complete Robot; The Complete Stories, Volume 2	Infinity Science Fiction, February 1957
"The Author's Ordeal"	1957	Earth Is Room Enough; The Complete Stories, Volume 1	Science Fiction Quarterly, May 1957
"Blank!"	1957	Buy Jupiter and Other Stories; The Complete Stories: Mother Earth and Other Stories	Infinity Science Fiction, June 1957
"Does a Bee Care?"	1957	Buy Jupiter and Other Stories; Robot Dreams	If: Worlds of Science Fiction, June 1957
"A Woman's Heart"	1957	—	Satellite, June 1957
"Profession"	1957	Nine Tomorrows; The Asimov Chronicles: Fifty Years of Isaac Asimov; The Complete Stories, Volume 1	Astounding Science Fiction, July 1957
"A Loint of Paw"	1957	Asimov's Mysteries; The Best Science Fiction of Isaac Asimov; The Complete Stories, Volume 2	The Magazine of Fantasy and Science Fiction, August 1957
"Ideas Die Hard"	1957	The Winds of Change and Other Stories	Galaxy Science Fiction, October 1957
"I'm in Marsport Without Hilda"	1957	Nine Tomorrows (bowdlerized version); Asimov's Mysteries; The Best Science Fiction of Isaac Asimov; The Complete Stories, Volume 1	Venture Science Fiction, November 1957
"Insert Knob A in Hole B"	1957	Nightfall and Other Stories; The Complete Stories, Volume 1	The Magazine of Fantasy and Science Fiction, December 1957
"Galley Slave"	1957	The Rest of the Robots; The Complete Robot; Robot Visions; The Complete Stories, Volume 2	Galaxy Science Fiction, December 1957
"The Gentle Vultures"	1957	Nine Tomorrows; The Complete Stories, Volume 1	Super-Science Fiction, December 1957
"Spell My Name with an S" (also as "S, as in Zebatinsky")	1958	Nine Tomorrows; Robot Dreams; The Best Science Fiction of Isaac Asimov; The Complete Stories, Volume 1	Star Science Fiction, January 1958
"Lenny"	1958	The Rest of the Robots; The Complete Robot; Robot Visions; The Complete Stories, Volume 2	Infinity Science Fiction, January 1958
"I Just Make Them Up, See!"	1958	Nine Tomorrows; The Best Science Fiction of Isaac Asimov; The Complete Stories, Volume 1	The Magazine of Fantasy and Science Fiction, February 1958
"The Feeling of Power"	1958	Nine Tomorrows; Opus 100; The Edge of Tomorrow; Robot Dreams; The Best Science Fiction of Isaac Asimov; The Complete Stories, Volume 1	If: Worlds of Science Fiction, February 1958
"Silly Asses"	1958	Buy Jupiter and Other Stories; The Complete Stories: Mother Earth and Other Stories	Future Science Fiction, February 1958
"All the Troubles of the World"	1958	Nine Tomorrows; The Best Science Fiction of Isaac Asimov; The Complete Stories, Volume 1	Super-Science Fiction, April 1958
"Buy Jupiter"	1958	Buy Jupiter and Other Stories; The Complete Stories: Mother Earth and Other Stories	Venture Science Fiction, May 1958
"The Up-to-Date Sorcerer"	1958	Nightfall and Other Stories; The Complete Stories, Volume 1	The Magazine of Fantasy and Science Fiction, July 1958
"The Ugly Little Boy" (also as "Lastborn")	1958	Nine Tomorrows; The Edge of Tomorrow; Robot Dreams; The Best Science Fiction of Isaac Asimov; The Asimov Chronicles: Fifty Years of Isaac Asimov; The Complete Stories, Volume 1	Galaxy Science Fiction, September 1958
"A Statue for Father" (also as "Benefactor of Humanity")	1959	Buy Jupiter and Other Stories; The Complete Stories, Volume 2	Satellite Science Fiction, February 1959
"Anniversary"	1959	Asimov's Mysteries; The Best of Isaac Asimov; The Complete Stories, Volume 2	Amazing Science Fiction Stories, March 1959
"Unto the Fourth Generation"	1959	Nightfall and Other Stories; The Best Science Fiction of Isaac Asimov; The Asimov Chronicles: Fifty Years of Isaac Asimov; The Complete Stories, Volume 1	The Magazine of Fantasy and Science Fiction, April 1959
"Obituary"	1959	Asimov's Mysteries; The Best Science Fiction of Isaac Asimov; The Complete Stories, Volume 2	The Magazine of Fantasy and Science Fiction, August 1959
"Rain, Rain, Go Away"	1959	Buy Jupiter and Other Stories; The Complete Stories, Volume 2	Fantastic Universe, September 1959
"Rejection Slips"	1959	Nine Tomorrows; Science Fiction by Asimov; The Complete Stories, Volume 1	Nine Tomorrows (Doubleday, 1959)
"The Covenant" (Asimov wrote part two of this five-part round-robin story.)	1960	—	Fantastic Story Magazine, July 1960
"Thiotimoline and the Space Age"	1960	Opus 100; The Asimov Chronicles: Fifty Years of Isaac Asimov	Analog Science Fiction and Fact, October 1960
"What Is This Thing Called Love?" (also as "Playboy and the Slime God")	1961	Nightfall and Other Stories; The Complete Stories, Volume 1	Amazing Stories, March 1961
"The Machine That Won the War"	1961	Nightfall and Other Stories; Robot Dreams; The Asimov Chronicles: Fifty Years of Isaac Asimov; The Complete Stories, Volume 1	The Magazine of Fantasy and Science Fiction, October 1961
"My Son, the Physicist"	1962	Nightfall and Other Stories; The Best Science Fiction of Isaac Asimov; The Asimov Chronicles: Fifty Years of Isaac Asimov; The Complete Stories, Volume 1	Scientific American, February 1962
"Star Light"	1962	Asimov's Mysteries; The Complete Stories, Volume 2	Scientific American, October 1962
"Author! Author!"	1964 (written in 1943)	The Early Asimov; The Asimov Chronicles: Fifty Years of Isaac Asimov; The Complete Stories: Mother Earth and Other Stories	The Unknown Five (Pyramid Books, January 1964)
"Eyes Do More Than See"	1965	Nightfall and Other Stories; Robot Dreams; The Best Science Fiction of Isaac Asimov; Science Fiction by Asimov; The Asimov Chronicles: Fifty Years of Isaac Asimov; The Complete Stories, Volume 1	The Magazine of Fantasy and Science Fiction, April 1965
"Founding Father"	1965	Buy Jupiter and Other Stories; The Complete Stories, Volume 2	Galaxy Science Fiction, October 1965
"The Man Who Made the 21st Century"	1965	—	Boys' Life, October 1965
"The Key"	1966	Asimov's Mysteries; The Best Mysteries of Isaac Asimov; The Asimov Chronicles: Fifty Years of Isaac Asimov; The Complete Stories, Volume 2	The Magazine of Fantasy and Science Fiction, October 1966
"The Prime of Life"	1966	The Bicentennial Man and Other Stories; The Complete Stories: Mother Earth and Other Stories	The Magazine of Fantasy and Science Fiction, October 1966
"The Billiard Ball"	1967	Asimov's Mysteries; The Best of Isaac Asimov; The Edge of Tomorrow; Robot Dreams; The Asimov Chronicles: Fifty Years of Isaac Asimov; The Complete Stories, Volume 2	If: Worlds of Science Fiction, March 1967
"Segregationist"	1967	Nightfall and Other Stories; The Complete Robot; Robot Visions; The Complete Stories, Volume 1	Abbottempo, book 4, 1967
"Exile to Hell"	1968	Buy Jupiter and Other Stories; The Asimov Chronicles: Fifty Years of Isaac Asimov; The Complete Stories, Volume 2	Analog Science Fiction/Science Fact, May 1968
"Key Item" (also as "The Computer That Went on Strike")	1968	Buy Jupiter and Other Stories; The Complete Stories, Volume 2	The Magazine of Fantasy and Science Fiction, July 1968
"The Proper Study"	1968	Buy Jupiter and Other Stories; The Complete Stories: Mother Earth and Other Stories	Boys' Life, September 1968
"The Holmes-Ginsbook Device"	1968	Opus 100	If: Worlds of Science Fiction, December 1968
"Feminine Intuition"	1969	The Bicentennial Man and Other Stories; The Complete Robot; The Asimov Chronicles: Fifty Years of Isaac Asimov; Robot Visions; The Complete Stories, Volume 2	The Magazine of Fantasy and Science Fiction, October 1969
"Waterclap"	1970	The Bicentennial Man and Other Stories; The Complete Stories: Mother Earth and Other Stories	If: Worlds of Science Fiction, April 1970
"A Problem of Numbers" (also as "As Chemist to Chemist")	1970	The Best Mysteries of Isaac Asimov; The Asimov Chronicles: Fifty Years of Isaac Asimov	Ellery Queen's Mystery Magazine, May 1970
"2430 A.D."	1970	Buy Jupiter and Other Stories; The Complete Stories: Mother Earth and Other Stories	IBM Magazine, October 1970
"The Best New Thing"	1971	The Best New Thing	The Best New Thing (World Publishing Co., 1971)
"The Greatest Asset"	1972	Buy Jupiter and Other Stories; The Complete Stories, Volume 2	Analog Science Fiction/Science Fact, January 1972
"The Acquisitive Chuckle"	1972	Tales of the Black Widowers; The Return of the Black Widowers	Ellery Queen's Mystery Magazine, January 1972
"Mirror Image"	1972	The Best of Isaac Asimov; The Complete Robot; The Asimov Chronicles: Fifty Years of Isaac Asimov; Robot Visions; The Complete Stories, Volume 2	Analog Science Fiction/Science Fact, May 1972
"Ph as in Phony" (also as "The Phony PhD")	1972	Tales of the Black Widowers; The Return of the Black Widowers	Ellery Queen's Mystery Magazine, July 1972
"Truth to Tell" (also as "The Man Who Never Told a Lie")	1972	Tales of the Black Widowers	Ellery Queen's Mystery Magazine, October 1972
"Go, Little Book!" (also as "The Matchbook Collector")	1972	Tales of the Black Widowers	Ellery Queen's Mystery Magazine, December 1972
"Take a Match"	1972	Buy Jupiter and Other Stories; The Complete Stories, Volume 2	New Dimensions II (Doubleday, 1972)
"Thiotimoline to the Stars"	1973	Buy Jupiter and Other Stories; The Complete Stories: Mother Earth and Other Stories	Astounding: John W. Campbell Memorial Anthology (Random House, 1973)
"Early Sunday Morning" (also as "The Biological Clock")	1973	Tales of the Black Widowers; The Return of the Black Widowers	Ellery Queen's Mystery Magazine, March 1973
"The Obvious Factor"	1973	Tales of the Black Widowers; The Best Mysteries of Isaac Asimov; The Return of the Black Widowers	Ellery Queen's Mystery Magazine, May 1973
"The Pointing Finger"	1973	Tales of the Black Widowers; The Best Mysteries of Isaac Asimov	Ellery Queen's Mystery Magazine, July 1973
"Miss What?" (also as "A Warning to Miss Earth")	1973	Tales of the Black Widowers	Ellery Queen's Mystery Magazine, September 1973
"Light Verse"	1973	Buy Jupiter and Other Stories; Opus 200; The Complete Robot; Robot Dreams; The Asimov Chronicles: Fifty Years of Isaac Asimov; The Complete Stories, Volume 2	The Saturday Evening Post, September–October 1973
"Out of Sight" (also as "The Six Suspects")	1973	Tales of the Black Widowers; The Best Mysteries of Isaac Asimov	Ellery Queen's Mystery Magazine, December 1973
"Yankee Doodle Went to Town"	1974	Tales of the Black Widowers; The Best Mysteries of Isaac Asimov	Tales of the Black Widowers (Doubleday, 1974)
"The Lullaby of Broadway"	1974	Tales of the Black Widowers	Tales of the Black Widowers (Doubleday, 1974)
"The Curious Omission"	1974	Tales of the Black Widowers	Tales of the Black Widowers (Doubleday, 1974)
"The Dream"	1974	"The Dream", "Benjamin's Dream" and "Benjamin's Bicentennial Blast" (limited edition); Opus 200	The Saturday Evening Post, January 1974
"When No Man Pursueth"	1974	More Tales of the Black Widowers	Ellery Queen's Mystery Magazine, March 1974
"Benjamin's Dream" (also as "The Second Dream")	1974	"The Dream", "Benjamin's Dream" and "Benjamin's Bicentennial Blast" (limited edition)	The Saturday Evening Post, April 1974
"Party by Satellite" (also as "The Third Dream")	1974	—	The Saturday Evening Post, May 1974
"Quicker Than the Eye"	1974	More Tales of the Black Widowers; The Best Mysteries of Isaac Asimov	Ellery Queen's Mystery Magazine, May 1974
". . . That Thou Art Mindful of Him"	1974	The Bicentennial Man and Other Stories; The Complete Robot; The Asimov Chronicles: Fifty Years of Isaac Asimov; The Complete Stories, Volume 2	The Magazine of Fantasy and Science Fiction, May 1974
"Stranger in Paradise"	1974	The Bicentennial Man and Other Stories; The Complete Robot; The Complete Stories, Volume 2	If: Worlds of Science Fiction, May–June 1974
"Benjamin's Bicentennial Blast" (also as "The Fourth Dream")	1974	"The Dream", "Benjamin's Dream" and "Benjamin's Bicentennial Blast" (limited edition)	The Saturday Evening Post, June and July 1974
"The Iron Gem"	1974	More Tales of the Black Widowers; The Return of the Black Widowers	Ellery Queen's Mystery Magazine, July 1974
"Half-Baked Publisher's Delight" (co-written with Jeffrey S. Hudson)	1974	The Best from If, Volume III; 100 Great Science Fiction Short Short Stories	Worlds of If, July–August 1974
"The Three Numbers" (also as "All in the Way You Read It")	1974	More Tales of the Black Widowers; The Best Mysteries of Isaac Asimov	Ellery Queen's Mystery Magazine, September 1974
"Nothing Like Murder"	1974	More Tales of the Black Widowers	The Magazine of Fantasy and Science Fiction, October 1974
"No Smoking" (also as "Confessions of an American Cigarette Smoker")	1974	More Tales of the Black Widowers	Ellery Queen's Mystery Magazine, December 1974
"The Heavenly Host"	1974	The Heavenly Host (an extended version of the original short story)	Boys' Life, December 1974
"Big Game"	1974 (written in 1941)	Before the Golden Age	Before the Golden Age (Doubleday, 1974)
"The Life and Times of Multivac"	1975	The Bicentennial Man and Other Stories; The Complete Stories, Volume 2	The New York Times, Sunday, 5 January 1975
"Sarah Tops" (also as "Try Sarah Tops")	1975	The Key Word and Other Mysteries	Boys' Life, February 1975
"A Boy's Best Friend"	1975	The Complete Robot	Boys' Life, March 1975
"The One and Only East"	1975	More Tales of the Black Widowers; The Best Mysteries of Isaac Asimov	Ellery Queen's Mystery Magazine, March 1975
"The Little Things"	1975	The Best Mysteries of Isaac Asimov	Ellery Queen's Mystery Magazine, May 1975
"Point of View"	1975	The Complete Robot	Boys' Life, July 1975
"Earthset and Evening Star"	1975	More Tales of the Black Widowers; Opus 200; The Asimov Chronicles: Fifty Years of Isaac Asimov	The Magazine of Fantasy and Science Fiction, August 1975
"About Nothing"	1975	The Winds of Change and Other Stories; Opus 300	First appeared on a postcard. (subsequently in Science Fiction Review, August 1975 and then Isaac Asimov's Science Fiction Magazine, Summer 1977)
"Halloween"	1975	The Best Mysteries of Isaac Asimov	American Way, October 1975
"A Case of Need"	1975	The Key Word and Other Mysteries	Young World Magazine, October 1975
"Santa Claus Gets a Coin"	1975	The Key Word and Other Mysteries	Boys' Life, December 1975
"Friday the Thirteenth"	1976	More Tales of the Black Widowers	The Magazine of Fantasy and Science Fiction, January 1976
"Season's Greetings!"	1976	More Tales of the Black Widowers	More Tales of the Black Widowers (Doubleday, 1976)
"The Unabridged"	1976	More Tales of the Black Widowers	More Tales of the Black Widowers (Doubleday, 1976)
"The Ultimate Crime"	1976	More Tales of the Black Widowers	More Tales of the Black Widowers (Doubleday, 1976)
"The Bicentennial Man"	1976	The Bicentennial Man and Other Stories; Opus 200; The Complete Robot; The Asimov Chronicles: Fifty Years of Isaac Asimov; Robot Visions; The Complete Stories, Volume 2	Stellar #2 (Ballantine Books, February 1976)
"The Winnowing"	1976	The Bicentennial Man and Other Stories; The Complete Stories: Mother Earth and Other Stories	Analog Science Fiction/Science Fact, February 1976
"Old-Fashioned"	1976	The Bicentennial Man and Other Stories; The Complete Stories, Volume 2	Bell Telephone Magazine, January–February 1976
"Marching In"	1976	The Bicentennial Man and Other Stories; The Complete Stories, Volume 2	High Fidelity, May 1976
"Birth of a Notion"	1976	The Bicentennial Man and Other Stories; The Complete Stories: Mother Earth and Other Stories	Amazing Stories, June 1976
"The Cross of Lorraine"	1976	Casebook of the Black Widowers; The Best Mysteries of Isaac Asimov	Ellery Queen's Mystery Magazine, May 1976
"The Tercentenary Incident"	1976	The Bicentennial Man and Other Stories; The Complete Robot; The Complete Stories, Volume 2	Ellery Queen's Mystery Magazine, August 1976
"The Family Man" (also as "A Case of Income Tax Fraud")	1976	Casebook of the Black Widowers	Ellery Queen's Mystery Magazine, November 1976
"Good Taste"	1976	Opus 200; The Winds of Change and Other Stories	Good Taste (Apocalypse Press, 1976) (limited edition) (subsequently in Isaac Asimov's Science Fiction Magazine, Fall 1977)
"To Tell at a Glance"	1977	The Winds of Change and Other Stories	The Saturday Evening Post, February 1977
"True Love"	1977	3 by Asimov; The Complete Robot; Robot Dreams; The Asimov Chronicles: Fifty Years of Isaac Asimov	American Way, February 1977
"Think!"	1977	The Complete Robot; Robot Visions	Isaac Asimov's Science Fiction Magazine, Spring 1977
"The Sports Page"	1977	Casebook of the Black Widowers	Ellery Queen's Mystery Magazine, April 1977
"Sure Thing"	1977	The Winds of Change and Other Stories; The Best Science Fiction of Isaac Asimov; Opus 300	Isaac Asimov's Science Fiction Magazine, Summer 1977
"The Thirteenth Day of Christmas"	1977	The Key Word and Other Mysteries; Opus 200; The Best Mysteries of Isaac Asimov	Ellery Queen's Mystery Magazine, July 1977
"The Missing Item"	1977	Casebook of the Black Widowers	Isaac Asimov's Science Fiction Magazine, Winter 1977
"The Key Word"	1977	The Key Word and Other Mysteries; The Best Mysteries of Isaac Asimov	The Key Word and Other Mysteries (Walker & Company, 1977)
"The Next Day"	1978	Casebook of the Black Widowers; The Best Mysteries of Isaac Asimov	Ellery Queen's Mystery Magazine, May 1978
"The Disappearing Man"	1978	The Key Word and Other Mysteries (British edition only); The Disappearing Man and Other Mysteries	Boys' Life, June 1978
"Found!"	1978	The Winds of Change and Other Stories; The Edge of Tomorrow; The Best Science Fiction of Isaac Asimov; The Asimov Chronicles: Fifty Years of Isaac Asimov	Omni, October 1978
"Fair Exchange?"	1978	3 by Asimov; The Winds of Change and Other Stories	Asimov's SF Adventure Magazine, Fall 1978
"Strike!"	1979	—	Omni, January 1979
"Nothing for Nothing"	1979	The Winds of Change and Other Stories; The Asimov Chronicles: Fifty Years of Isaac Asimov	Isaac Asimov's Science Fiction Magazine, February 1979
"Irrelevance!" (also as "A Matter of Irrelevance")	1979	Casebook of the Black Widowers	Ellery Queen's Mystery Magazine, March 1979
"How It Happened"	1979	The Winds of Change and Other Stories; Opus 300; The Best Science Fiction of Isaac Asimov	Asimov's SF Adventure Magazine, Spring 1979
"None So Blind"	1979	Casebook of the Black Widowers	Ellery Queen's Mystery Magazine, June 1979
"To the Barest"	1979	Casebook of the Black Widowers; The Return of the Black Widowers	Ellery Queen's Mystery Magazine, August 1979
"The Backward Look"	1979	Casebook of the Black Widowers	Isaac Asimov's Science Fiction Magazine, September 1979
"It Is Coming"	1979	The Winds of Change and Other Stories	Various newspapers, 1979 (advert for Field Enterprises)
"The Last Answer"	1980	3 by Asimov; The Winds of Change and Other Stories; Robot Dreams; The Best Science Fiction of Isaac Asimov	Analog Science Fiction / Science Fact, January 1980
"Second Best"	1980	Casebook of the Black Widowers	Casebook of the Black Widowers (Doubleday, January 1980)
"Middle Name"	1980	Casebook of the Black Widowers; The Best Mysteries of Isaac Asimov	Casebook of the Black Widowers (Doubleday, January 1980)
"What Time Is It?"	1980	Casebook of the Black Widowers; Opus 300; The Best Mysteries of Isaac Asimov	Casebook of the Black Widowers (Doubleday, January 1980)
"For the Birds"	1980	The Winds of Change and Other Stories; The Asimov Chronicles: Fifty Years of Isaac Asimov	Isaac Asimov's Science Fiction Magazine, May 1980
"Sixty Million Trillion Combinations"	1980	Banquets of the Black Widowers; The Best Mysteries of Isaac Asimov; The Return of the Black Widowers	Ellery Queen's Mystery Magazine, 5 May 1980
"The Woman in the Bar"	1980	Banquets of the Black Widowers; The Return of the Black Widowers	Ellery Queen's Mystery Magazine, 30 June 1980
"Getting Even"	1980	Tales from the Spaceport Bar	Gallery, August 1980
"No Refuge Could Save" (also as "To Spot a Spy")	1980	The Union Club Mysteries	Gallery, September 1980
"The Good Samaritan"	1980	Banquets of the Black Widowers; The Best Mysteries of Isaac Asimov	Ellery Queen's Mystery Magazine, 10 September 1980
"Death of a Foy"	1980	The Winds of Change and Other Stories; Opus 300; The Best Science Fiction of Isaac Asimov; Science Fiction by Asimov	The Magazine of Fantasy & Science Fiction, October 1980
"The Telephone Number" (also as "The Winning Number")	1980	The Union Club Mysteries	Gallery, October 1980
"The Men Who Wouldn't Talk" (also as "Pigeon English")	1980	The Union Club Mysteries	Gallery, November 1980
"A Clear Shot" (also as "Big Shot")	1980	The Union Club Mysteries	Gallery, December 1980
"The Year of the Action" (also as "The Gilbert and Sullivan Mystery")	1981	Banquets of the Black Widowers	Ellery Queen's Mystery Magazine, 1 January 1981
"Irresistible to Women" (also as "Call Me Irresistible")	1981	The Union Club Mysteries	Gallery, January 1981
"He Wasn't There" (also as "The Spy Who Was Out-of-Focus")	1981	The Union Club Mysteries; The Best Mysteries of Isaac Asimov	Gallery, February 1981
"The Thin Line" (also as "Taxicab Crackdown")	1981	The Union Club Mysteries	Gallery, March 1981
"Mystery Tune" (also as "Death Song")	1981	The Union Club Mysteries	Gallery, April 1981
"The Last Shuttle"	1981	The Winds of Change and Other Stories	Today (a Florida newspaper supplement), 10 April 1981
"Hide and Seek"	1981	The Union Club Mysteries; The Best Mysteries of Isaac Asimov	Gallery, May 1981
"Gift" (also as "Decipher Deception")	1981	The Union Club Mysteries	Gallery, June 1981
"Can You Prove It?"	1981	Banquets of the Black Widowers; The Best Mysteries of Isaac Asimov	Ellery Queen's Mystery Magazine, 17 June 1981
"Hot or Cold"	1981	The Union Club Mysteries	Gallery, July 1981
"The Thirteenth Page"	1981	The Union Club Mysteries	Gallery, August 1981
"1 to 999" (also as "One in a Thousand")	1981	The Union Club Mysteries; Opus 300	Gallery, September 1981
"Twelve Years Old" (also as "The 12-Year-Old Problem")	1981	The Union Club Mysteries	Gallery, October 1981
"A Perfect Fit"	1981	The Winds of Change and Other Stories; Opus 300	EDN, 14 October 1981
"Testing, Testing!" (also as "Cloak and Dagger Duel")	1981	The Union Club Mysteries	Gallery, November 1981
"The Appleby Story" (also as "The Last Laugh")	1981	The Union Club Mysteries	Gallery, December 1981
"Ignition Point!"	1981	The Winds of Change and Other Stories; The Asimov Chronicles: Fifty Years of Isaac Asimov	Finding the Right Speaker (American Society of Association Executives, 1981)
"Dollars and Cents" (also as "Countdown to Disaster")	1982	The Union Club Mysteries; The Best Mysteries of Isaac Asimov	Gallery, January 1982
"Friends and Allies" (also as "Mirror Image")	1982	The Union Club Mysteries	Gallery, February 1982
"Lest We Remember"	1982	The Winds of Change and Other Stories; Robot Dreams; The Asimov Chronicles: Fifty Years of Isaac Asimov	Isaac Asimov's Science Fiction Magazine, February 1982
"Which Is Which?" (also as "The Perfect Alibi")	1982	The Union Club Mysteries	Gallery, March 1982
"The Winds of Change"	1982	The Winds of Change and Other Stories; The Edge of Tomorrow	Speculations (Houghton Mifflin, April 1982)
"One Night of Song"	1982	The Winds of Change and Other Stories; Azazel	The Magazine of Fantasy & Science Fiction, April 1982
"The Sign" (also as "The Telltale Sign")	1982	The Union Club Mysteries; The Best Mysteries of Isaac Asimov	Gallery, April 1982
"The Phoenician Bauble"	1982	Banquets of the Black Widowers	Ellery Queen's Mystery Magazine, May 1982
"Catching the Fox" (also as "Stopping the Fox")	1982	The Union Club Mysteries	Gallery, May 1982
"Getting the Combination" (also as "Playing It by the Numbers")	1982	The Union Club Mysteries; The Best Mysteries of Isaac Asimov	Gallery, June 1982
"To the Victor"	1982	Azazel	Isaac Asimov's Science Fiction Magazine, July 1982
"The Library Book" (also as "Mystery Book")	1982	The Union Club Mysteries; Opus 300; The Best Mysteries of Isaac Asimov	Gallery, July 1982
"The Three Goblets" (also as "A Flash of Brilliance")	1982	The Union Club Mysteries	Gallery, August 1982
"Spell It!" (also as "Book Smart")	1982	The Union Club Mysteries	Gallery, September 1982
"Lucky Seven"	1982	The Disappearing Man and Other Mysteries	Boys' Life, September 1982
"The Dim Rumble"	1982	Science Fiction by Asimov; Azazel	Isaac Asimov's Science Fiction Magazine, October 1982
"Two Women" (also as "Cherchez la Femme: the Case of the Disappearing Woman")	1982	The Union Club Mysteries	Gallery, October 1982
"The Super Runner"	1982	—	Runner's World, October 1982
"The Smile That Loses"	1982	The Winds of Change and Other Stories; Opus 300; Azazel	The Magazine of Fantasy & Science Fiction, November 1982
"Sending a Signal" (also as "A Piece of the Rock")	1982	The Union Club Mysteries	Gallery, November 1982
"Half a Ghost" (also as "A Ghost of a Chance")	1982	The Union Club Mysteries	Gallery, December 1982
"There Was a Young Lady" (also as "Poetic License")	1983	The Union Club Mysteries	Gallery, January 1983
"Potential"	1983	Science Fiction by Asimov	Isaac Asimov's Science Fiction Magazine, February 1983
"State Capital" (also as "A Chemical Solution")	1983	—	Gallery, February 1983
"Never Out of Sight" (also as "The Amusement Lark")	1983	The Best Mysteries of Isaac Asimov	Gallery, March 1983
"The Favourite Piece" (also as "Face the Music")	1983	The Union Club Mysteries	Gallery, April 1983
"The Magic Umbrella" (also as "Stormy Weather")	1983	The Best Mysteries of Isaac Asimov	Gallery, May 1983
"A Monday in April"	1983	Banquets of the Black Widowers	Ellery Queen's Mystery Magazine, May 1983
"The Briefcase in the Taxi" (also as "Circuit Breaker")	1983	—	Gallery, June 1983
"The Bird That Sang Bass" (also as "Riddled With Clues")	1983	—	Gallery, July 1983
"The Last Caesar" (also as "Great Caesar's Ghost")	1983	—	Gallery, August 1983
"Saving Humanity"	1983	Azazel; The Asimov Chronicles: Fifty Years of Isaac Asimov	Isaac Asimov's Science Fiction Magazine, September 1983
"Nothing Might Happen"	1983	The Best Mysteries of Isaac Asimov	Alfred Hitchcock's Mystery Magazine, December 1983
"The Speck"	1983	The Best Mysteries of Isaac Asimov	Gallery, December 1983
"The Christmas Solution"	1983	The Disappearing Man and Other Mysteries	Boys' Life, December 1983
"A Matter of Principle"	1984	Azazel	Isaac Asimov's Science Fiction Magazine, February 1984
"Neither Brute nor Human"	1984	Banquets of the Black Widowers; The Asimov Chronicles: Fifty Years of Isaac Asimov	Ellery Queen's Mystery Magazine, April 1984
"The Evil Drink Does"	1984	Azazel	Isaac Asimov's Science Fiction Magazine, May 1984
"Writing Time"	1984	Azazel	Isaac Asimov's Science Fiction Magazine, July 1984
"Triply Unique"	1984	—	Ellery Queen's Mystery Magazine, July 1984
"The Intrusion"	1984	Banquets of the Black Widowers	Banquets of the Black Widowers (Doubleday, September 1984)
"The Driver"	1984	Banquets of the Black Widowers	Banquets of the Black Widowers (Doubleday, September 1984)
"The Wrong House"	1984	Banquets of the Black Widowers; The Return of the Black Widowers	Banquets of the Black Widowers (Doubleday, September 1984)
"The Redhead"	1984	Banquets of the Black Widowers; The Best Mysteries of Isaac Asimov; The Return of the Black Widowers	Ellery Queen's Mystery Magazine, October 1984
"The Ten-Second Election"	1984	—	Omni, November 1984
"Dashing Through the Snow"	1984	Science Fiction by Asimov; Azazel	Isaac Asimov's Science Fiction Magazine, mid-December 1984)
"The Year of the Feast"	1984	—	Ellery Queen's Mystery Magazine, December 1984
"The Queen and King"	1984	—	Espionage, December 1984
"Hallucination"	1985	Gold	Boys' Life, February, March and April 1985
"The Fourth Homonym"	1985	Puzzles of the Black Widowers; The Asimov Chronicles: Fifty Years of Isaac Asimov	Ellery Queen's Mystery Magazine, March 1985
"Upside Down"	1985	—	Ellery Queen's Mystery Magazine, June 1985
"Unique Is Where You Find It"	1985	The Edge of Tomorrow; Puzzles of the Black Widowers	The Edge of Tomorrow (Tor Books, July 1985)
"Triple Devil"	1985	Puzzles of the Black Widowers; The Return of the Black Widowers	Ellery Queen's Mystery Magazine, August 1985
"Logic Is Logic"	1985	Azazel	Isaac Asimov's Science Fiction Magazine, August 1985
"The Suspect" (also as "The Taunter")	1985	—	Ellery Queen's Mystery Magazine, October 1985
"He Travels the Fastest"	1985	Azazel	Isaac Asimov's Science Fiction Magazine, November 1985
"Straight Lines"	1985	—	Ellery Queen's Mystery Magazine, December 1985
"The Twins"	1985	The Disappearing Man and Other Mysteries	The Disappearing Man and Other Mysteries (Walker & Company, 1985)
"The Man in the Park"	1985	The Disappearing Man and Other Mysteries	The Disappearing Man and Other Mysteries (Walker & Company, 1985)
"Feghoot and the Courts" (also as "Burnside and the Courts")	1986	Gold	Bred Any Good Rooks Lately? (Doubleday, 1986)
"The Eye of the Beholder"	1986	Azazel; The Asimov Chronicles: Fifty Years of Isaac Asimov	Isaac Asimov's Science Fiction Magazine, January 1986
"Child's Play"	1986	—	Ellery Queen's Mystery Magazine, January 1986
"New England Equinox"	1986	—	Ellery Queen's Mystery Magazine, March 1986
"More Things in Heaven and Earth"	1986	Science Fiction by Asimov; Azazel	Science Fiction by Asimov (Davis Publications, 1986)
"Sunset on the Water"	1986	Puzzles of the Black Widowers	Ellery Queen's Mystery Magazine, June 1986
"Ten"	1986	—	Ellery Queen's Mystery Magazine, August 1986
"Zip Code"	1986	—	Boys' Life, September 1986
"Where Is He?"	1986	Puzzles of the Black Widowers	Ellery Queen's Mystery Magazine, October 1986
"The Mind's Construction"	1986	Azazel	Isaac Asimov's Science Fiction Magazine, October 1986
"Robot Dreams"	1986	Robot Dreams	Robot Dreams (Berkley Books, November 1986) (subsequently in Isaac Asimov's Science Fiction Magazine, mid-December 1986)
"The Common Name"	1986	—	Ellery Queen's Mystery Magazine, Mid-December 1986
"Left to Right"	1987	Gold	Analog Science Fiction / Science Fact, January 1987
"The Fights of Spring"	1987	Azazel	Isaac Asimov's Science Fiction Magazine, February 1987
"The Old Purse"	1987	Puzzles of the Black Widowers	Ellery Queen's Mystery Magazine, March 1987
"The Teddy Bear"	1987	—	Ellery Queen's Mystery Magazine, May 1987
"The Stamp"	1987	—	Ellery Queen's Mystery Magazine, June 1987
"Left to Right, and Beyond" ("Left to Right" with an alternative ending by Harrison Roth)	1987	—	Analog Science Fiction / Science Fact, July 1987
"Galatea"	1987	Azazel	Isaac Asimov's Science Fiction Magazine, mid-December 1987
"The Fable of the Three Princes"	1987	Magic	Spaceships and Spells (Harper & Row, 1987)
"The Two-Centimeter Demon"	1988	Azazel	Azazel (Doubleday, 1988)
"The Quiet Place"	1988	Puzzles of the Black Widowers; The Asimov Chronicles: Fifty Years of Isaac Asimov	Ellery Queen's Mystery Magazine, March 1988
"The Legacy"	1988	—	Ellery Queen's Mystery Magazine, April 1988
"The Turning Point"	1988	The Drabble Project	The Drabble Project (Beccon Publications, April 1988) (limited edition)
"Flight of Fancy"	1988	Azazel	Isaac Asimov's Science Fiction Magazine, May 1988
"The Lost Dog"	1988	Mysterious Menagerie	Ellery Queen's Mystery Magazine, June 1988
"The Smile of the Chipper" (also as "Man as the Ultimate Gadget")	1988	Gold	Supplement to Bloomberg Businessweek, 21 October 1988 (subsequently in Isaac Asimov's Science Fiction Magazine, April 1989)
"I Love Little Pussy"	1988	The Asimov Chronicles: Fifty Years of Isaac Asimov	Isaac Asimov's Science Fiction Magazine, November 1988
"Christmas Without Rodney"	1988	Robot Visions	Isaac Asimov's Science Fiction Magazine, mid-December 1988
"The Instability"	1989	Gold	The Observer, 1 January 1989
"Good-bye to Earth"	1989	Gold	Interview, January 1989
"The Last Man"	1989	—	Ellery Queen's Mystery Magazine, March 1989
"The Envelope"	1989	Puzzles of the Black Widowers	Ellery Queen's Mystery Magazine, April 1989
"Alexander the God"	1989	Gold	Columbia, June / July 1989
"Northwestward"	1989	The Return of the Black Widowers; Magic	The Further Adventures of Batman (Bantam Books, July 1989)
"The Mad Scientist"	1989	Magic	Analog Science Fiction / Science Fact, July 1989
"To Your Health"	1989	Magic	Isaac Asimov's Science Fiction Magazine, August 1989
"The Alibi"	1989	Puzzles of the Black Widowers	Ellery Queen's Mystery Magazine, September 1989
"Ho! Ho! Ho!"	1989	Mistletoe Mysteries	Mistletoe Mysteries: Tales of Yuletide Murder (Mysterious Press, October 1989)
"Too Bad!"	1989	Robot Visions	The Microverse (Bantam, November 1989)
"The Lucky Piece"	1990	Puzzles of the Black Widowers	Puzzles of the Black Widowers (Doubleday, January 1990)
"The Four-Leaf Clover"	1990	Puzzles of the Black Widowers	Puzzles of the Black Widowers (Doubleday, January 1990)
"The Recipe"	1990	Puzzles of the Black Widowers	Puzzles of the Black Widowers (Doubleday, January 1990)
"Yes, but Why?"	1990	The Return of the Black Widowers	The Armchair Detective, Spring 1990
"Lost in a Space Warp"	1990	The Return of the Black Widowers	Ellery Queen's Mystery Magazine, March 1990
"Robot Visions"	1990	Robot Visions	Robot Visions (Roc Books, April 1990)
"Fault-Intolerant"	1990	Gold	Isaac Asimov's Science Fiction Magazine, May 1990
"Police at the Door"	1990	The Return of the Black Widowers	Ellery Queen's Mystery Magazine, June 1990
"In the Canyon"	1990	Gold	Omni, July 1990
"Wine Is a Mocker"	1990	Magic	Isaac Asimov's Science Fiction Magazine, July 1990
"Cal"	1990	Gold	Cal (Doubleday, 1990) (limited edition pamphlet)
"The Haunted Cabin"	1990	The Return of the Black Widowers	Ellery Queen's Mystery Magazine, October 1990
"The Time Traveller"	1990	Magic	Isaac Asimov's Science Fiction Magazine, November 1990
"Kid Brother"	1990	Gold	Isaac Asimov's Science Fiction Magazine, mid-December 1990
"Missing"	1991	—	Ellery Queen's Mystery Magazine, March 1991
"Baby, It's Cold Outside"	1991	Magic	Isaac Asimov's Science Fiction Magazine, June 1991
"The Guest's Guest"	1991	The Return of the Black Widowers	Ellery Queen's Mystery Magazine, August 1991
"Gold"	1991	Gold	Analog Science Fiction / Science Fact, September 1991
"Frustration"	1991	Gold	There Won't Be War (Tor Books, November 1991)
"Prince Delightful and the Flameless Dragon"	1991	Magic	Once Upon a Time: A Treasury of Modern Fairy Tales (Del Rey / Ballantine Books, November 1991)
"It's a Job"	1991	Magic	Isaac Asimov's Science Fiction Magazine, mid-December 1991
"The Critic on the Hearth"	1992	Magic	Isaac Asimov's Science Fiction Magazine, November 1992
"March Against the Foe"	1994	Magic	Isaac Asimov's Science Fiction Magazine, April 1994
"Battle-Hymn"	1995	Gold	Gold (HarperPrism, March 1995)
"The Nations in Space"	1995	Gold	Gold (HarperPrism, March 1995)

The collection I, Robot also contains a linking text at the beginning and end of the book, and in between some (but not all) of the stories, which form a framing story not found anywhere else.

A play by Asimov called The Story Machine, which is an adaptation of his short story "Someday", was published in the February 1958 issue of Plays.

In 1950 Asimov wrote a comic strip called "Star Empire" (art by Charles Schneeman). The first page appeared in the May 1990 issue of Argosy.

=== Stories never anthologised ===
Five published stories were never included in Asimov's own books. They were however included in other anthologies. These were "Half-Baked Publisher's Delight" (1974), "Getting Even" (1980), "The Turning Point" (1988), "The Lost Dog" (1988) and "Ho! Ho! Ho!" (1989).

Nine science fiction stories have never been collected in any book:

- "Question" (Computers and Automation, March 1955) had an ending which was similar to another author's 1952 story (although the rest of the story was different), and when this was pointed out to Asimov he promised never to publish it again, a promise he kept. By that time the story had already been reprinted in the April 30, 1957, issue of Science World.
- "The Portable Star" (Thrilling Wonder Stories, Winter 1955) was Asimov's least favourite story, and was anthologised without his permission in a magazine, A Treasury of Great Science Fiction Stories no. 1 (1964). (It has since been reprinted in Thrilling Wonder Stories, Summer 2007.)
- "A Woman's Heart" (Satellite, June 1957) was never collected because of Asimov's disdain for it.
- "The Covenant" (Fantastic Story Magazine, July 1960) was a five-part round-robin story to which five different authors contributed. Asimov wrote the second part. (It was reprinted in a magazine in 1966, Most Thrilling Science Fiction Ever Told Number 2.)
- "The Man Who Made the 21st Century" (Boys' Life, October 1965)
- "Party by Satellite" (The Saturday Evening Post, May 1974) (Original title "The Third Dream.")
- "Strike!" (Omni, January 1979) (reprinted in the magazine The Best of Omni Science Fiction No. 4)
- "The Super Runner" (Runner's World, October 1982)
- "The Ten-Second Election" (Omni, November 1984)

20 mystery stories have also never been anthologised. Of these, all but one are Union Club mystery stories (for a list, see The Union Club Mysteries). "Zip Code" (1986) is a mystery story featuring the boy detective character Larry.

== Lost stories ==
Nine stories which Asimov wrote early in his career were never published anywhere, and are now lost. They were:

1. (1938) "Cosmic Corkscrew" (9,000 words)
2. (1938) "This Irrational Planet" (3,000 words)
3. (1938) "Paths of Destiny" (6,000 words)
4. (1938) "Knossos in Its Glory" (6,000 words)
5. (1939) "The Decline and Fall" (6,000 words)
6. (1939) "Life Before Birth" (6,000 words)
7. (1939) "The Brothers" (6,000 words)
8. (1940) "The Oak" (6,000 words)
9. (1941) "Masks" (1,500 words)

In the 1972 anthology The Early Asimov, Asimov listed two other stories which he thought had also been lost: "The Weapon" (1938) and "Big Game" (1941). However, they were subsequently found ("The Weapon" had in fact been published under a pseudonym in 1942, which Asimov had forgotten). They were collected in In Memory Yet Green (1979) and Before the Golden Age (1974), respectively. (They are included in the above list of published stories.)

In his autobiography, Asimov wrote "Since February 1941, I have never written a piece of fiction that has not, in one way or another, seen print."

== See also ==
- Isaac Asimov bibliography
