= The Asimov Chronicles: Fifty Years of Isaac Asimov =

1989 collection of short stories and science essays by Isaac Asimov

- First edition
- Author: Isaac Asimov
- Cover artist: Ron Lindahn and Val Lakey Lindahn
- Language: English
- Genre: Science fiction
- Publisher: Dark Harvest
- Publication date: May 1989
- Publication place: United States
- Media type: Print (hardcover)
- Pages: 678
- ISBN: 0-913165-44-1

The Asimov Chronicles: Fifty Years of Isaac Asimov is a collection of forty eight short science fiction and mystery stories and two science essays by American writer Isaac Asimov, published by Dark Harvest in May 1989.

It is the only one of Asimov's collections to contain the Azazel fantasy story "I Love Little Pussy". (This story also appears in the anthology Magicats II (1991), featuring also other writers.)

== Contents ==
- "Marooned Off Vesta" (1939)
- "Robbie" (1940)
- "Nightfall" (1941), novellete
- "Runaround" (1942), novelette, Robot series
- "Death Sentence" (1943)
- "Catch That Rabbit" (1944)
- "Blind Alley" (1945), Galactic Empire series #4
- "Evidence" (1946), novelette
- "Little Lost Robot" (1947), novelette, Robot series
- "No Connection" (1948)
- "The Red Queen's Race" (1949), novelette
- "Green Patches" (1950)
- "Breeds There a Man...?" (1951), novelette
- "The Martian Way" (1952), novelette
- "Sally" (1953), Robot series
- "The Fun They Had" (1951)
- "Franchise" (1955), Multivac series
- "The Last Question" (1956), Multivac series
- "Profession" (1957), novella
- "The Ugly Little Boy" (1958), novelette
- "Unto the Fourth Generation" (1959)
- "Thiotimoline and the Space Age" (1960), Thiotimoline series #3
- "The Machine that Won the War" (1961), Multivac series
- "My Son, the Physicist" (1962), Multivac series
- "T-Formation" (1963), essay, reprinted from Adding a Dimension
- "Author! Author!" (1964), novelette
- "Eyes Do More Than See" (1965)
- "The Key" (1966), novelette, Wendell Urth series
- "The Billiard Ball" (1967), novelette
- "Exile to Hell" (1968)
- "Feminine Intuition" (1969), novelette, Robot series
- "A Problem of Numbers" (1970)
- "Bill and I" (1971), essay, reprinted from The Left Hand of the Electron
- "Mirror Image" (1972), Robot series #2.5
- "Light Verse" (1973), Robot series
- ". . . That Thou Art Mindful of Him" (1974), novelette, Robot series
- "Earthset and Evening Star" (1975), Black Widowers series
- "The Bicentennial Man" (1976), novelette, Robot series
- "True Love" (1977), Robot series, Multivac series
- "Found!" (1978)
- "Nothing for Nothing" (1979)
- "For the Birds" (1980)
- "Ignition Point!" (1981)
- "Lest We Remember" (1982), novelette
- "Saving Humanity" (1983), Azazel series
- "Neither Brute Nor Human" (1984), Black Widowers series
- "The Fourth Homonym" (1985), Black Widowers series
- "The Eye of the Beholder" (1986), Azazel series
- "The Quiet Place" (1988), Black Widowers series
- "I Love Little Pussy" (1988), Azazel series
