= The Return of the Black Widowers =

2003 collection of short mystery stories by Isaac Asimov

- Cover of first edition, 2003
- Author: Isaac Asimov
- Language: English
- Series: Black Widowers
- Genre: Mystery
- Publisher: Carroll & Graf
- Publication date: 2003
- Publication place: United States
- Media type: Print (hardcover)
- Pages: 304 pp
- ISBN: 0-7867-1248-1
- OCLC: 53171749
- Dewey Decimal: 813/.54 22
- LC Class: PS3551.S5 R48 2003
- Preceded by: Puzzles of the Black Widowers

The Return of the Black Widowers is a collection of short mystery stories by American writer Isaac Asimov, featuring his fictional club of mystery solvers, the Black Widowers. It was first published in hardcover by Carroll & Graf in December 2003, and in trade paperback by the same publisher in November 2005.

This book is the last of six books that collect the stories of the Black Widowers, a club based on a literary dining club Asimov belonged to known as the Trap Door Spiders. It was assembled and edited after Asimov's death by Charles Ardai, and collects the last six stories Asimov wrote for the series. These six stories are preceded by an introduction by Harlan Ellison, ten stories selected by the editor as the best from the previous Black Widowers collections, and a homage by William Brittain. They are then followed by an eleventh reprinted tale featuring a fictionalized version of Ellison, a new Black Widowers tale by Ardai, and an afterword by Asimov on the creation of the series drawn from his autobiography I. Asimov.

== Contents ==
- "Introduction" (Harlan Ellison)
- "The Acquisitive Chuckle" (from Tales of the Black Widowers)
- "Ph As in Phony" (from Tales of the Black Widowers)
- "Early Sunday Morning" (from Tales of the Black Widowers)
- "The Obvious Factor" (from Tales of the Black Widowers)
- "The Iron Gem" (from More Tales of the Black Widowers)
- "To the Barest" (from Casebook of the Black Widowers)
- "Sixty Million Trillion Combinations" (from Banquets of the Black Widowers)
- "The Wrong House" (from Banquets of the Black Widowers)
- "The Redhead" (from Banquets of the Black Widowers)
- "Triple Devil" (from Puzzles of the Black Widowers)
- "The Men Who Read Isaac Asimov" (William Brittain)
- "Northwestward" (from Magic)
- "Yes, but Why?"
- "Lost in a Space Warp"
- "Police at the Door"
- "The Haunted Cabin"
- "The Guest's Guest"
- "The Woman in the Bar" (from Banquets of the Black Widowers)
- "The Last Story" (Charles Ardai)
- "Afterword" (from I. Asimov)
