= Opus 300 =

1984 collection by Isaac Asimov

- Cover of the 1985 UK hardback edition
- Author: Isaac Asimov
- Language: English
- Publisher: Houghton Mifflin
- Publication date: 1984
- Publication place: United States
- Media type: Print (hardback, paperback)
- Pages: 378

Opus 300 is a collection by American writer and scientist Isaac Asimov. It was published by Houghton Mifflin in the United States in 1984, and by Robert Hale Ltd in the United Kingdom in 1985. Asimov chose to celebrate the publication of his three hundredth book by writing about his previous 99 books, including excerpts from short stories and novels, as well as nonfiction articles and books. Opus 300 also includes nine complete stories, several complete science essays, and one complete essay never before published, "The Forever Generation," which is not available anywhere else.

== Contents ==
- Introduction
- Part 1. Astronomy
  - "The Moon" (chapter 2 of Extraterrestrial Civilizations (1979))
  - Excerpts from Visions of the Universe (1981)
    - Mercury
    - Volcanoes on Venus
  - "Icarus" (excerpt from Venus, Near Neighbour of the Sun (1981))
  - Excerpt from The Science Fictional Solar System (1979) (about Pluto)
  - Excerpt from Foundation's Edge (1982)
- Part 2. Earth Sciences
  - "Below Earth's Atmosphere" (chapter 6 of Exploring Earth and the Cosmos (1982))
  - "Explosion at Thera" (excerpt from How Did We Find Out About Volcanoes? (1981))
  - "The Floating Crystal Palace" (complete science essay from The Road to Infinity (1979))
- Part 3. Mathematics
  - "To Ungild Refined Gold" (complete mathematics essay from X Stands for Unknown (1984))
  - Excerpt from The Measure of the Universe (1983)
  - "1 to 999" (complete mystery story from The Union Club Mysteries (1983))
- Part 4. Physics
  - "Let Einstein Be!" (complete science essay from Counting the Eons (1983))
  - "Converting It All" (complete science essay from Change! (1981))
- Part 5. Chemistry
  - "Big Brother" (complete science essay from X Stands for Unknown)
  - "Bread and Stone" (complete science essay from X Stands for Unknown)
- Part 6. Biology
  - Excerpt from How Did We Find Out About Genes? (1983)
  - Excerpt from How Did We Find Out About the Beginning of Life? (1982)
  - Excerpt from How Did We Find Out About Our Human Roots? (1979)
  - Excerpt from Caught in the Organ Draft (1983)
  - "Clone, Clone of My Own" (complete science essay from The Sun Shines Bright (1981))
- Part 7. Robots and Computers]
  - Excerpt from The Robots of Dawn (1983)
  - Excerpt from Norby, the Mixed-Up Robot (with Janet Asimov, 1983)
  - "A Perfect Fit" (complete science fiction story from The Winds of Change and Other Stories (1983))
  - "The Word Processor and I" (complete humour essay from The Roving Mind (1983))
- Part 8. History
  - Excerpt from A Choice of Catastrophes (1979) (complete essay about the history of warfare)
- Part 9. The Bible
  - Excerpt from In the Beginning (1981) (about Genesis 1:1)
- Part 10. Short-Shorts
  - "About Nothing" (complete science fiction story from The Winds of Change and Other Stories)
  - "Sure Thing" (complete science fiction story from The Winds of Change and Other Stories)
  - "Death of a Foy" (complete science fiction story from The Winds of Change and Other Stories)
  - "How It Happened" (complete story from The Winds of Change and Other Stories)
- Part 11. Humor
  - Five limericks from A Grossery of Limericks (1981)
  - "A Fuller Explanation of Original Sin" (with Janet Asimov; three verse limerick from Laughing Space (1981))
  - "The Smile That Loses" (complete Azazel fantasy story from The Winds of Change and Other Stories)
- Part 12. Social Sciences
  - "Alas, All Human" (complete essay about dishonest scientists in history, from The Sun Shines Bright)
  - "The Blind Who Would Lead" (complete essay condemning the Moral Majority, from The Roving Mind)
  - "That Old-Time Violence" (complete essay about violence, from The Roving Mind)
- Part 13. Literature
  - Excerpt from The Annotated Gulliver's Travels (1980)
  - "On Style" (introduction to the mystery story anthology Who Done It? (1980))
  - "First Person" (introduction to the science fiction anthology The Future I (1980))
- Part 14. Mysteries
  - "What Time Is It?" (complete mystery story from Casebook of the Black Widowers (1980))
  - "Library Book" (complete mystery story from The Union Club Mysteries)
- Part 15. Autobiography
  - "My Father" (complete essay from The Roving Mind)
- Part 16. Science Fiction
  - "The Boom in Science Fiction" (complete essay from Asimov on Science Fiction (1981))
  - "The Ring of Evil" (complete essay from Asimov on Science Fiction)
- Part 17. Miscellaneous
  - Excerpt from Isaac Asimov's Book of Facts (1979) (about cities)
  - "The Delight of Uncertainty" (introduction to Isaac Asimov Presents Superquiz 2 (1983))
- Part 18. Bonus
  - "The Forever Generation" (complete essay, never before published, about the adverse consequences of immortality)
- Appendix: My Third Hundred Books

== See also ==
- Opus 100
- Opus 200
