= What Time Is It? =

What Time Is It? may refer to:

- What Time Is It? (film) (Che ora è?), a 1989 Italian film starring Marcello Mastroianni
- What Time Is It? (album), a 1982 album by The Time
- "What Time Is It?" (song), a song from the film High School Musical 2 (2007)
- "What Time Is It?", a song by Spin Doctors from Pocket Full of Kryptonite (1991)
- What Time Is It?, a children's book by P. D. Eastman
- "What Time Is It?", a short story by Isaac Asimov, included in the collection Casebook of the Black Widowers (1980)
