= Science World =

Science World may refer to:

- Science World (magazine), a magazine for children grades 6–10 published by Scholastic Corporation
- ScienceWorld, an American science website by Wolfram Research
- Science World (Vancouver), a science centre in Vancouver, British Columbia, Canada
