= The Edge of Tomorrow (Asimov book) =

1985 book by Isaac Asimov

- Author: Edited by Isaac Asimov
- Cover artist: Boris Vallejo
- Language: English
- Genre: Science fiction
- Publisher: Tor Books
- Publication date: 1985
- Publication place: United States
- Media type: Print (hardcover)
- Pages: 462
- ISBN: 0-312-93200-6

The Edge of Tomorrow is a collection of short science fiction stories and science essays by Isaac Asimov, published by Tor Books in July 1985.

== Contents ==
- Foreword by Ben Bova
- Introduction by Isaac Asimov
- "Unique Is Where You Find It" (story)
- "The Eureka Phenomenon" (essay)
- "The Feeling of Power" (story)
- "The Comet That Wasn't" (essay)
- "Found!" (story)
- "Twinkle, Twinkle, Microwaves" (essay)
- "Pâté de Foie Gras" (story)
- "The Bridge of the Gods" (essay)
- "Belief" (story)
- "Euclid's Fifth" (essay)
- "The Plane Truth" (essay)
- "The Billiard Ball" (story)
- "The Winds of Change" (story)
- "The Figure of the Fastest" (essay)
- "The Dead Past" (story)
- "The Fateful Lightning (essay)
- "Breeds There a Man...?" (story)
- "The Man Who Massed the Earth" (essay)
- "Nightfall (story)
- "The Planet That Wasn't" (essay)
- "The Ugly Little Boy" (story)
- "The Three Who Died Too Soon" (essay)
- "The Last Question" (story)
- "The Nobel Prize That Wasn't" (essay)
