= The Weapon (short story) =

- Short story by Isaac Asimov
- Country: United States
- Language: English
- Genre: Science fiction

Publication
- Published in: Super Science Stories
- Publisher: Popular Publications
- Media type: Magazine
- Publication date: May 1942

"The Weapon" is a science fiction short story by American writer Isaac Asimov. Written in September 1938 when Asimov was 18, it was first published in the May 1942 issue of Super Science Stories under a pseudonym, H.B. Ogden. Because of the pseudonym, Asimov forgot that this story had ever been published and so, assuming that it had been rejected and believing that he no longer had a copy of it, he omitted it from The Early Asimov (1972), a collection of his earliest stories. In that book he listed "The Weapon" among eleven of his short stories that had been lost forever. However, while writing the first volume of his autobiography, In Memory Yet Green (1979), Asimov came across an entry in his diary which reminded him that the story had indeed been published. Obtaining a copy of the relevant magazine, he ensured that the story was published in chapter 30 of that book.

== Plot summary ==
Democracy has been all but eradicated on Earth as a result of wars waged by totalitarian states. Preston Calvin travels to Mars to seek the assistance of the technologically superior Martians. He asks them to provide him with a weapon: not a weapon of destruction, but a chemical which the Martians used on themselves aeons ago to temper the emotions of anger and hate, allowing them to reject war and violence, and which Calvin intends to use to influence humanity for the better. But the Martians refuse to give it to him, insisting that "every civilization must work out its own destiny".

Calvin resolves to steal the chemical. He infiltrates a laboratory on Deimos and, after a long search, eventually finds the information he needs, but at the moment of discovery he himself is discovered by the Martians. It transpires that they knew he would attempt to steal the weapon and had been monitoring his progress since he began.

However, the Martians tell Calvin that by attempting to steal the weapon (even though they could easily have prevented him), he has taken Earth's destiny in his own hands, and so has earned the right to keep the weapon. "It has not been given you; you have taken it." He returns to Earth with the weapon.

== See also ==
- "Big Game" (short story), another short story Asimov thought was lost in 1972 but which resurfaced
- Isaac Asimov short stories bibliography
