= Opus 200 =

1979 book by Isaac Asimov

- First edition
- Author: Isaac Asimov
- Language: English
- Publisher: Houghton Mifflin
- Publication date: 1979
- Publication place: United States
- Media type: Print (hardback, paperback)
- Pages: 329 pp
- ISBN: 0-395-27625-X

Opus 200 is Isaac Asimov's joint two-hundredth book, along with his autobiography In Memory Yet Green (both books were published on the same day, following his 199th book). It was published by Houghton Mifflin in March 1979. Asimov chose to celebrate the publication of his two hundredth book by writing about his previous 198 books, including excerpts from short stories and novels, as well as nonfiction articles and books. Opus 200 also includes three complete science fiction stories, two complete mystery stories and two complete essays.

== Contents ==
Introduction

Part 1 - Astronomy

- Excerpt from The Gods Themselves
- Excerpt from ABCs of Space
- Excerpt from How Did We Find Out About Comets?
- Excerpt from Comets and Meteors
- Excerpt from Alpha Centauri, the Nearest Star
- Excerpt from The Collapsing Universe

Part 2 - Robots

- "The Bicentennial Man"

Part 3 - Mathematics

- Excerpt from How Did We Find Out About Numbers?
- Excerpt from "Skewered!"

Part 4 - Physics

- Excerpt from Light
- Excerpt from Please Explain
- Excerpt from Worlds Within Worlds

Part 5 - Chemistry

- "Good Taste"

Part 6 - Biology

- Excerpt from How Did We Find Out About Germs?
- Excerpt from The Ends of the Earth

Part 7 - Words

- Excerpt from More Words of Science

Part 8 - History

- Excerpt from The Land of Canaan
- Excerpt from The Shaping of France
- Excerpt from The Golden Door
- Excerpt from Eyes on the Universe
- "The Dream"

Part 9 - The Bible

- "Lost in Non-Translation"

Part 10 - Short-shorts

- "Light Verse"
- "The Monsters We Have Lived With"

Part 11 - Humor

- Excerpt from Isaac Asimov's Treasury of Humor
- Excerpt from The Sensuous Dirty Old Man
- Excerpt from Lecherous Limericks
- Excerpt from More Lecherous Limericks
- Excerpt from Still More Lecherous Limericks

Part 12 - Social Sciences

- Excerpt from Earth: Our Crowded Spaceship

Part 13 - Literature

- Excerpt from Asimov's Guide to Shakespeare
- Excerpt from Asimov's Annotated Don Juan
- Excerpt from Asimov's Annotated Paradise Lost
- Excerpt from Familiar Poems Annotated
- Excerpt from Asimov's Sherlockian Limericks

Part 14 - Mysteries

- Excerpt from Tales of the Black Widowers
- "Earthset and Evening Star"
- "The Thirteenth Day of Christmas"
- Excerpt from Murder at the ABA

Part 15 - Autobiography

- Excerpt from Before the Golden Age
- "Little Brothers"

Appendix

- "My Second Hundred Books"

== See also ==
- Opus 100
- Opus 300
