= Azazel (Asimov) =

1988 short story collection by Isaac Asimov

First edition (publ. Doubleday) Cover art by Robert Goldstrom

Azazel is a character created by Isaac Asimov and featured in a series of fantasy short stories. Azazel is a two-centimeter-tall demon (or extraterrestrial), named after the Biblical demon.

Some of these stories were collected in Azazel, first published in 1988. The stories take the form of conversations between an unnamed writer (whom Asimov identifies in the collection introduction as himself) and a shiftless friend named George (named in "The Two-Centimeter Demon" as George Bitternut). At these meetings George tells how he is able to conjure Azazel and describes their adventures together. George's greatest goal in life is a free lunch (or dinner, or ride, etc.), but Azazel is constrained so that he cannot directly benefit George. George can only call upon Azazel for favors to various friends, which invariably go awry. The stories' theme about a demon or alien that grants wishes echoes an earlier work by Lester del Rey, titled "No Strings Attached" from 1954.

"Getting Even" (1980) was the first story featuring Azazel, and was also the first "Union Club Mystery". Asimov stated that this story was omitted from both The Union Club Mysteries (1983) and the Azazel collection because it did not match the later stories in either series. However, it does appear in another anthology, Tales from the Spaceport Bar.

"Perfectly Formal" (1991) was a story within a story, purportedly written by a robot called Cal. It appeared in a story (also called "Cal") about a robot who learns to write stories. "Cal" appeared in the collection Gold.

== Short story collection ==
The introduction of this book describes how Asimov came to create Azazel, with an explanation about how the stories and book came to be published. Stories included are:

- "The Two-Centimeter Demon" – Written to introduce this collection, this story describes how the writer and George first met, and supplies information about Azazel. The tale is of George's goddaughter, in love with a mediocre basketball player. Azazel is asked to improve his game.
- "One Night of Song" – A man asks revenge on mistress who cruelly dumped him - by giving her one night performing with a perfect voice.
- "The Smile That Loses" – A woman asks George to capture her husband's radiantly happy smile in a photograph.
- "To the Victor" – A young man is unsuccessful with women, so Azazel boosts his pheromones.
- "The Dim Rumble" – A speleologist informs George that he has discovered a sound amplifier underground which, when disturbed, caused rumbles all over the world.
- "Saving Humanity" – A man wishes to be cured of being a jinx - but also wants, as compensation, to be able to save humanity.
- "A Matter of Principle" – An advertising man wants to write novels, but is unable to get past the first paragraph. George hopes to enrich himself with a share of the man's profit as a novelist.
- "The Evil Drink Does" – A beautiful but forceful girl wants to get close to a man but can't overcome her inhibitions, and is extremely sensitive to alcohol.
- "Writing Time" – An author is exasperated by the amount of time he must spend waiting everywhere he goes.
- "Dashing Through the Snow" – In order to stay at a friend's country retreat during the winter, George arranges for him to be able to fly over snow.
- "Logic Is Logic" – An idle rich man loves his snobbish club but makes no friends there, so Azazel gives him the ability to tell jokes.
- "He Travels the Fastest" – George's former lover marries a rich man, but he is miserly and will not take her abroad. Azazel gives him the urge to travel.
- "The Eye of the Beholder" – Two homely people fall in love and marry each other, but then the girl wishes she could be beautiful for him.
- "More Things in Heaven and Earth" – An economist wants to accept a new position, but each person in the post has survived a shorter time period.
- "The Mind's Construction" – A young detective believes any story a suspect tells him.
- "The Fights of Spring" – An old friend's son at college is actually studying instead of the usual youthful pursuits. George arranges for the 97-pound weakling to beat the college bully.
- "Galatea" – A young sculptress is in love with a male statue she has created.
- "Flight of Fancy" – A skeptic argues with believers about the Bible, but what he really wants is to fly like an angel.

== List of stories ==
Most of the Azazel stories originally appeared in magazines, such as Isaac Asimov's Science Fiction Magazine, The Magazine of Fantasy & Science Fiction, Analog Science Fiction/Science Fact, and Gallery. Besides the Azazel collection, a number of the stories featuring George and Azazel appear in other Asimov collections including The Winds of Change and Other Stories, Science Fiction by Asimov, The Asimov Chronicles, Magic, and as part of the "Cal" story in the Gold collection.

Title	First published in	Year/Month	Collection appears in
"Getting Even"	Gallery	1980/08	(Anthology) Tales from the Spaceport Bar, George H. Scithers and Darrell Schweitzer, eds. Avon (pbk.), January 1987
"One Night of Song"	The Magazine of Fantasy & Science Fiction	1982/04	Azazel and The Winds of Change and Other Stories
"To the Victor"	Isaac Asimov's Science Fiction Magazine	1982/07	Azazel
"The Dim Rumble"	Isaac Asimov's Science Fiction Magazine	1982/10	Azazel and Science Fiction by Asimov
"The Smile That Loses"	The Magazine of Fantasy & Science Fiction	1982/11	Azazel and The Winds of Change and Other Stories
"Saving Humanity"	Isaac Asimov's Science Fiction Magazine	1983/09	Azazel and The Asimov Chronicles
"A Matter of Principle"	Isaac Asimov's Science Fiction Magazine	1984/02	Azazel
"The Evil Drink Does"	Isaac Asimov's Science Fiction Magazine	1984/05	Azazel
"Writing Time"	Isaac Asimov's Science Fiction Magazine	1984/07	Azazel
"Dashing Through the Snow"	Isaac Asimov's Science Fiction Magazine	1984/12	Azazel and Science Fiction by Asimov
"Logic Is Logic"	Isaac Asimov's Science Fiction Magazine	1985/08	Azazel
"He Travels the Fastest"	Isaac Asimov's Science Fiction Magazine	1985/11	Azazel
"The Eye of the Beholder"	Isaac Asimov's Science Fiction Magazine	1986/01	Azazel and The Asimov Chronicles
"More Things in Heaven and Earth"	Science Fiction by Asimov	1986/NA	Azazel
"The Mind's Construction"	Isaac Asimov's Science Fiction Magazine	1986/10	Azazel
"The Fights of Spring"	Isaac Asimov's Science Fiction Magazine	1987/02	Azazel
"Galatea"	Isaac Asimov's Science Fiction Magazine	1987/12	Azazel
"Flight of Fancy"	Isaac Asimov's Science Fiction Magazine	1988/05	Azazel
"The Two-Centimeter Demon"	Azazel	1988/NA	Azazel
"I Love Little Pussy"	Isaac Asimov's Science Fiction Magazine	1988/11	The Asimov Chronicles
"The Mad Scientist"	Analog Science Fiction/Science Fact	1989/07	Magic
"To Your Health"	Isaac Asimov's Science Fiction Magazine	1989/08	Magic
"Wine Is a Mocker"	Isaac Asimov's Science Fiction Magazine	1990/07	Magic
"The Time Traveler"	Isaac Asimov's Science Fiction Magazine	1990/11	Magic
"Baby, It's Cold Outside"	Isaac Asimov's Science Fiction Magazine	1991/06	Magic
"It's a Job"	Isaac Asimov's Science Fiction Magazine	1991/12	Magic
"The Critic on the Hearth"	Asimov's Science Fiction	1992/11	Magic
"March Against the Foe"	Asimov's Science Fiction	1994/04	Magic
"Perfectly Formal"	"Cal"	1991/NA	Gold

== Sources ==
- Asimovonline.com
- Introduction to Azazel collection by Isaac Asimov
- I. Asimov: A Memoir by Isaac Asimov, chapter 148
- "Isaac Asimov’s short fiction (by category)" listing by John H. Jenkins
