= Big Game (short story) =

- Short story by Isaac Asimov
- Country: United States
- Language: English
- Genre: Science fiction short story

Publication
- Published in: Before the Golden Age
- Publisher: Doubleday
- Media type: Book
- Publication date: April 1974

"Big Game" is a short story (1,000 words) by the American science fiction writer Isaac Asimov. He wrote it in November 1941 when he was 21, failed to sell it to any magazine, and eventually lost the manuscript. In 1972 when Asimov compiled a collection of his earliest stories, The Early Asimov, he listed "Big Game" as the last of eleven stories which he had failed to publish anywhere and which he thought were lost forever. However a fan of his, Matthew B. Tepper, discovered the missing manuscript in a collection of Asimov's old papers which were archived in the library of Boston University and sent it to him. Asimov included it in an anthology he was editing at the time, Before the Golden Age (1974), although he pointed out that he had re-used the plot of the rejected story to write "Day of the Hunters" in 1950.

== Plot summary ==
The entire story consists of a conversation in a bar. A drunk man tries to convince his audience that ten years ago he built a time machine and travelled back to before the extinction of the dinosaurs, where he met an intelligent race of humanoid dinosaurs who communicated with him telepathically. These dinosaurs enthusiastically hunted other dinosaur species as game. The drunk believes that when they wiped out all other species, they turned on each other, and that is the true cause of the extinction of the dinosaurs. He concludes by observing that humans are likely to end up the same way.

== Significance in Asimov's personal life ==
Asimov read the manuscript aloud at a meeting of the Brooklyn Authors Club, and one of the attendees was so impressed by the story that he invited Asimov on a double date. Since Asimov had no girlfriend, a blind date was arranged, and this was how Asimov met his first wife.

== See also ==
- Isaac Asimov short stories bibliography
- "The Weapon" (short story), another short story Asimov thought was lost in 1972 but later resurfaced
