= The Best Mysteries of Isaac Asimov =

1986 collection of mystery short stories by Isaac Asimov

- Cover of first edition, 1986
- Author: Isaac Asimov
- Language: English
- Genre: Mystery
- Publisher: Doubleday
- Publication date: 1986
- Publication place: United States
- Media type: Print (hardcover)
- Pages: 345
- ISBN: 0-385-19783-7

The Best Mysteries of Isaac Asimov is a collection of mystery short stories by American author Isaac Asimov. It was first published in hardcover by Doubleday in 1986, and in paperback by the Fawcett Crest imprint of Ballantine Books in September 1987.

The book contains thirty-one stories by Asimov, including fifteen featuring his fictional club of mystery solvers, the Black Widowers, nine of his Union Club mysteries, and seven others (one featuring his science fictional detective Wendell Urth and two featuring his boy detective Larry). Most were reprinted from mystery magazines.

== Contents ==
- Black Widowers
  - "The Obvious Factor"
  - "The Pointing Finger"
  - "Out of Sight"
  - "Yankee Doodle Went to Town"
  - "Quicker Than the Eye"
  - "The Three Numbers"
  - "The One and Only East"
  - "The Cross of Lorraine"
  - "The Next Day"
  - "What Time Is It?"
  - "Middle Name"
  - "Sixty Million Trillion Combinations"
  - "The Good Samaritan"
  - "Can You Prove It?"
  - "The Redhead"
- Union Club
  - "He Wasn't There"
  - "Hide and Seek"
  - "Dollars and Cents"
  - "The Sign"
  - "Getting the Combination"
  - "The Library Book"
  - "Never Out of Sight"
  - "The Magic Umbrella"
  - "The Speck"
- Other
  - "The Key"
  - "A Problem of Numbers"
  - "The Little Things"
  - "Halloween"
  - "The Thirteenth Day of Christmas"
  - "The Key Word"
  - "Nothing Might Happen"
