= The Key (short story) =

- Short story by Isaac Asimov
- Country: United States
- Language: English
- Genre: Science fiction mystery

Publication
- Published in: The Magazine of Fantasy & Science Fiction
- Publication date: October 1966

Chronology
- Series: Wendell Urth
Star Light (short story)	The Billiard Ball

"The Key" is a science fiction mystery novelette by American writer Isaac Asimov. It is one of the stories featuring the reclusive scientist Wendell Urth. It first appeared in The Magazine of Fantasy & Science Fiction in October 1966, and was reprinted in the anthologies Asimov's Mysteries (1968) and The Best Mysteries of Isaac Asimov (1986).

== Plot summary ==
In this short story, somewhere on the Moon is hidden an extraterrestrial artifact. Two explorers, Jennings and Strauss, discovered it, but Jennings is dead and Strauss is insane. The artifact seems to be able to amplify and transmit thoughts, even to the extent of allowing one person to damage the mind of another. The only clues are a piece of paper with cryptic symbols, numbers, and letters written on it, and the babblings of the remaining member of the expedition, Strauss. Strauss is a member of the Ultras, a eugenicist society dedicated to eliminating "non-essential" people, reducing the human population to a few million who think like themselves. It is feared that the device could enable the Ultras to carry out their plan. The original paper has already disappeared, presumably stolen by an Ultra, and the investigators have only a copy to work with. The clues on the piece of paper seem to point to different locations on the Moon, but one stands out: a vertical arrow pointing upwards to the astrological symbol for Earth. One of the investigators realizes that the message means "go to Earth", or more exactly, "go to Urth". Jennings was a former student of the extraterrologist Wendell Urth. He died of a stab wound from Strauss, but not before rendering Strauss insane using the power of the artifact, and then going to some unknown place to hide it. The mysterious paper was found inside a spacesuit gauntlet.

When the investigators contact Wendell Urth, he recalls Jennings was a man who liked bad puns. Urth professes to enjoy a good pun, but found Jennings' efforts irritating. Reading the paper clue and listening to the audio log, he concludes that the symbols are mostly red herrings. They are too ambiguous and contradictory to be useful. Instead he tells the investigators the story of the astronomer Christof Klau, a German Jesuit mathematician and astronomer who modified the proposal of the modern Gregorian calendar. His audience is puzzled until he tells them that in the recordings of Strauss's ravings there are frequent mentions of the artifact as "the key" to the future of the world. He tells them that, with his brain activity heightened by the artifact, Jennings achieved his greatest pun by linking the words "clue" and "key". "Clue" sounds similar to "Klau"; the Latinized form of Klau was Clavius, which is similar to the Latin word "clavis", which means "key"; so the "clue" and the "key" to the mystery were the same thing, linked by the bilingual pun. Urth directs the investigators to look in the lunar crater Clavius, at the point where Earth would be directly overhead (indicated by the arrow pointing to Earth). He also tells them that their fears about the Ultras using the device are groundless. Strauss was unable to use the artifact himself. Urth also knew Strauss as a student, and was aware of his cold, calculating nature. He believes that the one human characteristic that the artifact operates on is empathy, a quality the Ultras do not possess.
