= Murder at the ABA =

1976 mystery novel by Isaac Asimov

- First edition dust cover
- Author: Isaac Asimov
- Language: English
- Genre: Mystery novel
- Publisher: Doubleday
- Publication date: 1976
- Publication place: United States
- Media type: Print (hardcover & paperback)
- Pages: 230
- ISBN: 0-385-11305-6
- OCLC: 1975026
- Dewey Decimal: 813/.5/4
- LC Class: PZ3.A8316 Mur PS3551.S5M8

Murder at the ABA (1976) is a mystery novel by American writer Isaac Asimov, following the adventures of a writer and amateur detective named Darius Just, whom Asimov modeled on his friend Harlan Ellison. While attending a convention of the American Booksellers Association, Just discovers the dead body of a friend and protégé. Convinced that the death was due to murder, but unable to convince the police, Just decides to investigate on his own.

The book is an example of metafiction, as Asimov himself appears as a character doing research for a murder mystery set at a booksellers' convention.

In 1979 Asimov described Murder at the ABA as "my favourite book of all two hundred I have written so far."

Murder at the ABA was published as Authorised Murder in the United Kingdom.

== Origins ==
Asimov recounts the unusual history behind Murder at the ABA in his second autobiographical volume, In Joy Still Felt (1980). According to Asimov, a book named Murder at Frankfurt had been written, placing a fictional mystery story at the Frankfurt Book Fair (Germany). His Doubleday editor, Larry Ashmead, proposed that Asimov write a similar book about the American Booksellers Association.

Asimov attended the ABA convention in New York City and absorbed enough "local color" to invent the setting, characters and "gimmick" of his mystery story. Ashmead then informed him that Doubleday needed the book in time for the next year's convention, which meant that Asimov had only three months in which to write it. Consequently, the novel is full of odd constructions, such as footnotes where Just and Asimov debate the latter's storytelling style, which Asimov knew critics would pan. He said later that he needed the fun to keep himself working.

== Plot outline ==
Darius Just had previously helped novice writer Giles Devore produce a breakthrough novel. Just credits himself with ruthlessly editing Devore's original drafts and forcing the young author to turn an incoherent mess into a masterwork. Having gained fame and fortune with his first book, a bestseller, Devore attends the ABA convention to promote his second book, which he wrote without Just's help. Just volunteers to run an errand for Devore – collecting a parcel for him and taking it to his hotel room – but he forgets to do so until the next day. Entering Devore's hotel room, Just discovers Devore dead in the bathroom, apparently having slipped in the shower and hit his head on the faucets. Others take this to be a tragic accident and nothing more, but Just suspects murder, based on Devore's compulsive tidiness and the disarray in which Just found the room. He interviews Devore's ex-wife, who tells him that the parcel contained Devore's monogrammed pens.

Just eventually ties the death to drug dealing at the hotel. Ironically, the object that led the murderer to kill Devore was a pen which Devore had borrowed during an autograph session because Just had failed to deliver him his own pens.

== Characters ==
Almost all of the speaking parts in Murder at the ABA belong to fictional characters. Asimov included several people who actually attended the New York convention but only one of them, Walter Sullivan of The New York Times, has any spoken dialogue. He speaks only when he is introduced to Darius Just, saying "Oh, yes" in such a convincing manner that Just is almost fooled into believing Sullivan has heard of him.

Darius Just would later reappear in Asimov's Black Widowers story "The Woman in the Bar", first published in Ellery Queen's Mystery Magazine and later included in the collection Banquets of the Black Widowers. It recounts one of his other adventures.

=== Fictional ===
- Darius Just – narrator, a writer modeled on Harlan Ellison
- Giles Devore – Just's protégé, author of Crossover and Evergone
- Sarah Voskovek – public relations manager at the hotel where the convention occurs
- Thomas and Theresa Valier – executives of Prism Press, Just and Devore's publisher
- Roseann Bronstein – bookseller
- Eunice Devore – lawyer, Giles Devore's wife
- Henrietta Corvass – interview secretary for the ABA, modeled on Harriette Waterman Getz; Publicity Director for the ABA
- Anthony Marsogliani – Chief of Hotel Security
- Michael P. Strong – Hotel Security employee
- Shirley Jennifer – writer of romance novels and close friend of Darius Just
- Nellie Griswold – employee of Hercules Press

=== Cameos of real individuals ===
- Isaac Asimov – eccentric and prolific writer who attends the convention gathering "local color" for a mystery
- Charles Berlitz – mystic, participant on a panel
- Douglas Fairbanks, Jr. – actor
- Uri Geller – purported telekinetic, participant on a panel
- Anita Loos – novelist, Hollywood screenwriter, and former actress
- Rose Namath Szolnoki – Joe Namath's mother
- Cathleen Nesbitt – actress
- Carl Sagan – astronomer, participant on a panel
- Walter Sullivan – moderator of a panel discussion
- Muhammad Ali – speaker
- Leo Durocher – glimpsed briefly by Darius Just, who reminisces about the days when he was a Giants fan and Durocher was one of his villains (before Durocher's 1948 move to the Giants). Just feels grateful that the memory allows him to forget the murder for a moment.

== See also ==
- The Death Dealers
- The Caves of Steel
- The Naked Sun

== Sources ==
- Asimov, Isaac. Murder at the ABA (Doubleday: 1976). ISBN 0-385-11305-6.
