= Only a Trillion =

1957 essay collection by Isaac Asimov

- First edition
- Author: Isaac Asimov
- Language: English
- Publisher: Abelard-Schuman
- Publication date: 1957
- Publication place: United States
- Media type: Print (Hardback and Paperback)
- Pages: 195

Only a Trillion is a collection of ten science essays and three scientific spoof articles by Isaac Asimov. It was the first collection of science essays published by Asimov. It was first published by Abelard-Schuman in 1957. A paperback edition published by Ace Books in 1976 included updates of outdated material (re-issued in 1980). The book was also published under the title Marvels of Science by Collier Books in 1962.

The title refers to the number of atoms of astatine-215 in the top 10 miles of the Earth's crust of the North and South American continents – only a trillion.

== Contents ==
1. The Atoms That Vanish (first published in Change!, 1957)
2. The Explosions Within Us (original article)
3. Hemoglobin and the Universe (first published in Astounding Science Fiction, Feb. 1955)
4. Victory on Paper (first published in Astounding, Sept. 1955)
5. The Abnormality of Being Normal (first published in Astounding, May 1956)
6. Planets Have an Air About Them (first published in Astounding, March 1957)
7. The Unblind Workings of Chance (first published in Astounding, April 1957)
8. The Trapping of the Sun (first published in Astounding, May 1957)
9. The Sea-Urchin and We (first published in Astounding, July 1957)
10. The Sound of Panting (first published in Astounding, June 1955)
11. The Marvellous Properties of Thiotimoline
  1. The Endochronic Properties of Resublimated Thiotimoline (first published in Astounding, March 1948)
  2. The Micropsychiatric Applications of Thiotimoline (first published in Astounding, Dec. 1953)
12. Pâté de Foie Gras (first published in Astounding, Sept. 1956)

== Reception ==
Floyd C. Gale stated that Asimov "[a]lmost certainly had enormous fun writing this collection of articles. He staggers, frightens, amazes and, in two, fiendishly misleads his reader".

Following the publication of Only a Trillion, Asimov compiled several more science essays into the manuscript for another, similar book titled Only a Light-Year, but that book was never published, because Only a Trillion had not sold enough copies.
