= Speculations (book) =

- Author: Edited by Isaac Asimov and Alice Laurance
- Language: English
- Genre: Science fiction anthology
- Publisher: Houghton Mifflin
- Publication date: 1982
- Publication place: United States
- Media type: Print (hardcover)
- Pages: 288
- ISBN: 0-395-32065-8

Speculations is an anthology of 17 short science fiction stories published by Houghton Mifflin in 1982. It was edited by Isaac Asimov and Alice Laurance. Instead of crediting the authors in the usual manner, it encouraged readers to guess who wrote which story, and provided a code which could be broken to give the answers.

== Contents ==
- Foreword: The Scope of Science Fiction, Isaac Asimov
- Nor Iron Bars a Cage, Roger Robert Lovin
- Surfeit, Alan Dean Foster
- The Winds of Change, Isaac Asimov
- Harpist, Joe L. Hensley
- Great Tom Fool, or The Conundrum of the Calais Customhouse Coffers, R. A. Lafferty
- The Hand of the Bard, Mack Reynolds
- The Man Who Floated in Time, Robert Silverberg
- Flee to the Mountains, Rachel Cosgrove Payes
- Last Day, Gene Wolfe
- The Newest Profession, Phyllis Gotlieb
- A Break for the Dinosaurs, Jack Williamson
- Event at Holiday Rock, Jacqueline Lichtenberg
- A Touch of Truth, Alice Laurance and William K. Carlson
- "Do I Dare to Eat a Peach?" Bill Pronzini and Barry N. Malzberg
- ...Old...As a Garment, Zenna Henderson
- Flatsquid Thrills, Scott Baker
- The Mystery of the Young Gentleman, Joanna Russ
- Biographies of the Authors (uncredited)
- To Break the Code (uncredited)

== ISBN ==
- ISBN 0-395-32065-8
- ISBN 978-0-395-32065-5
