= Pâté de Foie Gras (short story) =

- Short story by Isaac Asimov
- Country: United States
- Language: English
- Genre: Science fiction

Publication
- Published in: Astounding Science Fiction
- Publisher: Street & Smith
- Media type: Magazine
- Publication date: September 1956

"Pâté de Foie Gras" is a 1956 science fiction short story and literary puzzle by American writer Isaac Asimov, originally published by Astounding Science Fiction.

Like Asimov's "The Endochronic Properties of Resublimated Thiotimoline", "Pâté de Foie Gras" is a scientific spoof article, updating one of Aesop's Fables, The Goose that Laid the Golden Eggs. It is also a puzzle with an intended single answer.

== Plot ==
A Department of Agriculture employee tells of the discovery on a farm in Texas of a goose that lays golden eggs, and how US government and academic researchers try to solve the mystery of the goose. While its eggs are valuable as pure gold, learning how the bird produces the metal is more important. After the scientists realize that the goose is unharmed despite the enzyme-catalyzed nuclear process that converts oxygen-18 to gold-197 producing gamma rays, they discover that it is immune to all radioactivity, converting any unstable isotope to a stable isotope. The goose is "the perfect defense against the atomic age", one researcher observes; large-scale industrial reproduction of its biological transmutation process would ease nuclear waste disposal and defend against radioactive fallout, and modifying the mechanism would produce any element as needed.

The bird poses a dilemma, however. A biopsy of the liver provides no useful results; to learn more, it will be necessary to dissect an intact liver and study developing embryos, but there is only one goose. Since its eggs contain a lot of gold, the bird cannot reproduce due to a heavy-metal poisoning. The narrator decides to contact Isaac Asimov—who is both an experienced writer and biochemist, and whose thiotimoline articles received much public attention—and have him write up the story, soliciting the readers of Astounding for ideas.

== Solution ==
In a commentary on the story, Asimov wrote that it was his intention for there to be a single solution discoverable by the reader. The hint dropped in the story is the description of an experiment in which the goose's gold production goes up when it is given water enriched with oxygen-18, which would indicate a possible source of the gold produced. This implies that if the goose is maintained in a closed environment, it will convert all the oxygen-18 to gold, while still being able to breathe the predominant oxygen nuclide (oxygen-16). It will excrete all the gold in its eggs, at which point it can be expected to start producing fertile eggs.

Advances in science have led to other proposed solutions, such as cloning the goose.

== Publication history ==
The story was first published in the September 1956 issue of Astounding Science Fiction. It appeared in Asimov's 1957 science essay collection Only a Trillion, in his 1968 short story collection Asimov's Mysteries, and in The Complete Stories, Vol. 2. It also appeared in the anthology Where Do We Go from Here? edited by Asimov and in The Edge of Tomorrow.
