= Day of the Hunters =

- Short story by Isaac Asimov
- Country: United States
- Language: English
- Genre: Science fiction

Publication
- Published in: Future Combined with Science Fiction Stories
- Publisher: Columbia Publications Ltd.
- Media type: Magazine
- Publication date: November 1950

"Day of the Hunters" is a science fiction short story by American writer Isaac Asimov. It was published in the November 1950 issue of Future Combined with Science Fiction Stories, edited by Robert W. Lowndes, and reprinted in the 1975 collection Buy Jupiter and Other Stories. "Day of the Hunters" is based on "Big Game", a story written many years earlier that was unpublished and assumed to have been lost until discovered in the author's collected papers at Boston University.

== Plot summary ==
A group of technicians in a bar meet someone whom they assume to be a drunken down-and-out. It slowly emerges that he is an ex-university professor who has not only built a time machine but also traveled back to the Mesozoic era to see for himself what happened to cause the extinction of the dinosaurs. He becomes more belligerent as he is teased and pressed, and he eventually reveals that by the time of his arrival, all of the large dinosaurs had already been killed by small intelligent lizards armed with guns that were systematically wiping out their own kind until none was left to kill.
