= Asimov's Mysteries =

1968 collection of short stories by Isaac Asimov

- Dust-jacket from the first edition
- Author: Isaac Asimov
- Cover artist: James McMullan
- Language: English
- Genre: Mystery, Science fiction
- Publisher: Doubleday
- Publication date: 1968
- Publication place: United States
- Media type: Print (hardcover)
- Pages: xii + 240
- ISBN: 0-385-09063-3

Asimov's Mysteries, published in 1968, is a collection of 14 short stories by American writer Isaac Asimov, almost all of them science fiction mysteries (although, as Asimov admits in the introduction, some are only borderline). The stories were all originally published in magazines between 1954 and 1967, except for "Marooned off Vesta", Asimov's first published story, which first appeared in 1939.

Four stories in the collection feature the character of Wendell Urth, who is a leading extra-terrologist (an expert on alien worlds and life originating on them). Urth is eccentric in that he has a phobia of all mechanical forms of transport (an exaggeration of Asimov's own aversion to flying). Physically Urth resembles Norbert Wiener.

Urth appears in the stories when he is consulted by an agent of the Terrestrial Bureau of Investigation, H. Seton Davenport, in cases which have him baffled – a parallel with the way in which Inspector Lestrade consults Sherlock Holmes. In a fifth story in the collection, "The Dust of Death", Asimov shows Davenport a generosity that Conan Doyle never extended to Lestrade in demonstrating the former's ability to solve a case for himself without Urth's assistance.

== Contents ==
- "The Singing Bell" (1955), a Wendell Urth story
- "The Talking Stone" (1955), a Wendell Urth story
- "What's in a Name?" (1956)
- "The Dying Night" (1956), novelette, a Wendell Urth story
- "Pâté de Foie Gras" (1956)
- "The Dust of Death" (1957)
- "A Loint of Paw" (1957)
- "I'm in Marsport Without Hilda" (1957), a bowdlerized version of this story appeared in the collection Nine Tomorrows
- "Marooned off Vesta" (1939)
- "Anniversary" (1959), a Multivac story and a sequel to "Marooned off Vesta"
- "Obituary" (1959)
- "Star Light" (1962)
- "The Key" (1966), novelette, a Wendell Urth story
- "The Billiard Ball" (1967), novelette

== Reception ==
Criticizing the Urth stories as "rather contrived and not particularly entertaining", Algis Budrys said that the collection was "a poor book because it is a book about clevernesses, and clevernesses are not Isaac's long suit".

Edward Wellen wrote a pastiche story featuring Urth, "Murder in the Urth Degree," that was included in the 1989 volume Foundation's Friends.

== Sources ==
- Tuck, Donald H. (1974). The Encyclopedia of Science Fiction and Fantasy. Chicago: Advent. p. 21. ISBN 0-911682-20-1.
