= Science Fiction by Asimov =

1986 collection of fiction by Isaac Asimov

First edition

Science Fiction by Asimov is a collection of six short stories and one poem by American author Isaac Asimov. Published by Davis Publications in 1986, it was given away free to subscribers of Asimov's SF Magazine.

== Content ==
- "More Things In Heaven and Earth" (1986), Azazel series
- "Rejection Slips" (1959), poem
- "Death of a Foy" (1980)
- "Dashing Through the Snow" (1984), Azazel series
- "Potential" (1983), Multivac series
- "Eyes Do More Than See" (1965)
- "The Dim Rumble" (1982), Azazel series

It is the only collection of Asimov's stories to include "Potential", a Multivac story first published in Isaac Asimov's Science Fiction Magazine in the February 1983 issue. The story also appeared in The 1984 Annual World's Best SF and Tales from Isaac Asimov's Science Fiction Magazine (1986).
