= Opus 100 =

Book by Isaac Asimov

- Dust-jacket from the first edition
- Author: Isaac Asimov
- Language: English
- Publisher: Houghton Mifflin
- Publication date: 1969
- Publication place: United States
- Media type: Print (Hardback, paperback)
- Pages: 318
- ISBN: 978-0-395-07351-3

Opus 100 is a collection by American writer and scientist Isaac Asimov. It was published by Houghton Mifflin on 16 October 1969. Asimov chose to celebrate the publication of his hundredth book by writing about his previous 99 books, including excerpts from short stories and novels, as well as nonfiction articles and books. Opus 100 also includes five complete science fiction stories and one complete science essay.

== Contents ==
Introduction

Part 1. Astronomy

- Excerpt from "The Callistan Menace"
- Excerpt from Lucky Starr and the Moons of Jupiter
- Excerpt from "View from Amalthea" from The Solar System and Back
- Excerpt from Lucky Starr and the Oceans of Venus
- Excerpt from "The Martian Way"
- Excerpt from The Universe
- Excerpt from Galaxies

Part 2. Robots

- Excerpt from "The Perfect Machine" from Today and Tomorrow and ...
- Excerpt from "Strange Playfellow" (usually titled "Robbie")
- Excerpt from "Liar!"
- Excerpt from "Runaround"
- Excerpt from "I, Robot"
- Excerpt from The Intelligent Man's Guide to Science
- "The Last Question"

Part 3. Mathematics

- Excerpt from Realm of Numbers
- Excerpt from Quick and Easy Math
- "The Feeling of Power"

Part 4. Physics

- Excerpt from Asimov's Biographical Encyclopedia of Science and Technology
- Excerpt from the introduction to Only a Trillion
- Excerpt from The Neutrino
- Excerpt from "Superneutron"

Part 5. Chemistry

- Excerpt from "The Sound of Panting" from Only a Trillion
- Excerpt from Biochemistry and Human Metabolism
- Excerpt from The Chemicals of Life
- Excerpt from The Noble Gases
- "Thiotimoline and the Space Age"
- Excerpt from The Kinetics of the Reaction Inactivation of Tyrosinase during its Catalysis of the Aerobic Oxidation of Catechol (his PhD thesis)

Part 6. Biology

- Excerpt from The Wellsprings of Life
- Excerpt from Photosynthesis

Part 7. Words

- Excerpts from Words of Science
  - "Helium"
  - "Idiot"
  - "RH Negative"
- Excerpts from Words on the Map
  - "New Jersey"
  - "Philadelphia"
  - "Virgin Islands"
- Excerpts from Words from History
  - "Bloody Shirt"
  - "Mob"
  - "Potemkin Village"

Part 8. History

- Excerpt from The Greeks
  - "The Spartan Way of Life"
- Excerpt from The Roman Republic
- Excerpt from The Egyptians
- Excerpt from The Near East
- Excerpt from "There's Nothing Like a Good Foundation" from Asimov on Science Fiction
- Excerpt from "The Dead Hand"

Part 9. The Bible

- Excerpt from Asimov's Guide to the Bible
- "Twelve Point Three Six Nine" from Science, Numbers, and I

Part 10. Short Shorts

- Excerpt from Please Explain
- "On Prediction", an introduction to Future Tense edited by Richard Curtis
- "An Uncompromising View", a review of Mechanical Men by Dean E. Wooldridge
- "Dreamworld"

Part 11. Humor

- "The Holmes-Ginsbook Device"

Appendix: My Hundred Books

== Reception ==
Algis Budrys gave Opus 100 a mixed review, saying "the book as a whole demands so many shifts of personality and attitude in the reader that no one, not even Asimov, could keep up with them comfortably."

== See also ==
- Opus 200
- Opus 300
