= Asimov's SF Adventure Magazine =

Science fiction magazine (1978–1979)

First issue cover

Asimov's SF Adventure Magazine was a science fiction magazine which lasted from late 1978 to late 1979. It was published by Davis Publications out of New York City and was edited by George H. Scithers. After releasing only four issues, and losing some $50,000, publisher Joel Davis decided to cease publication of Asimov's SF Adventure Magazine.

== Famous contributors ==
- Poul Anderson
- Isaac Asimov
- John Brunner
- Samuel R. Delany
- Alan Dean Foster
- Joe Haldeman
- Barry B. Longyear
- Roger Zelazny

== Magazines with similar names ==
In 1977 Asimov's Science Fiction began publication as a digest size science fiction magazine called Asimov's Science Fiction Magazine. Unlike Asimov's SF Adventure Magazine it remains in print to this day.

== See also ==
- List of defunct American periodicals
