= Marching In =

- Short story by Isaac Asimov
- Country: United States
- Language: English
- Genre: Science fiction

Publication
- Published in: High Fidelity
- Publication type: Periodical
- Publisher: ABC Consumer Magazines
- Media type: Print (Magazine, Hardback & Paperback)
- Publication date: May 1976

"Marching In" is a science fiction short story by American writer Isaac Asimov. The story was written at the request of the American publication High Fidelity, with the stipulation that it be 2,500 words long, set about twenty-five years in the future and deal with some aspect of sound recording.

== Plot summary ==
In the year 2001, Jerome Bishop, a jazz composer and trombonist, was asked by Dr. Cray to assist in a project at a mental hospital, lending his musical knowledge to an experimental treatment of depression.

Although initially doubtful that he has anything to offer, he agrees to work on it and returns a few days later. He suggests to Dr. Cray that the irresistible rhythm of a revival hymn can snap anyone out of depression and demonstrates this by humming the opening beat of "When the Saints Go Marching In", which makes the patient feel much better and even gets Dr. Cray's toes tapping.
