= The Ultimate Crime =

- Short story by Isaac Asimov
- Country: United States
- Language: English
- Genres: Science fiction and mystery short story

Publication
- Published in: More Tales of the Black Widowers
- Publisher: Doubleday
- Media type: Print
- Publication date: 1976

Chronology
- Series: Black Widowers
The Unabridged	The Cross of Lorraine

"The Ultimate Crime" is a short story by Isaac Asimov, dealing with a minor aspect of one of the Sherlock Holmes stories of Sir Arthur Conan Doyle. It is the 24th of Asimov's Black Widowers mystery stories, and it appeared in his anthology More Tales of the Black Widowers (Doubleday, 1976), which collects the second dozen stories of the series. It was written specially for that book. It subsequently appeared again in Sherlock Holmes Through Time and Space (Severn House, 1985), an anthology of stories written by different authors and co-edited by Asimov, and Another Round at the Spaceport Bar (Avon 1989).

== Background ==
In 1973 Asimov became a member of The Baker Street Irregulars (BSI), a fan club for Sherlock Holmes enthusiasts. A requirement for membership was that each new member should write and deliver a paper dealing with some question concerning any of the Sherlock Holmes stories, but this was waived in Asimov's case since he did not know the stories well enough. However, in 1975 the BSI decided to publish a collection of such articles, and members Banesh Hoffmann and Michael Harrison asked Asimov to write one. Hoffmann suggested that he write about The Dynamics of an Asteroid, a fictional treatise on astronomy written by Holmes's arch-enemy, Professor Moriarty. The Dynamics of an Asteroid is mentioned only once in Doyle's novel The Valley of Fear (1914), where it is described as a book renowned for containing such rarefied mathematics that there was supposedly no other scientist capable of fully understanding it. However, there were no other clues as to what its contents might be, since Doyle had written no more about it. Hoffmann therefore asked Asimov to speculate about what Moriarty might have written. This idea appealed to Asimov, and he wrote a 1,600-word essay on the matter, "Dynamics of an Asteroid", which was published in Beyond Baker Street: A Sherlockian Anthology (Bobbs-Merrill, 1976).

Asimov was so pleased with the result that he decided that his ideas deserved a wider audience, and so as soon as he finished writing the article he expanded it into a Black Widowers mystery story, "The Ultimate Crime", for publication in More Tales of the Black Widowers.

== Plot ==
Ronald Mason is the guest at the monthly dinner of the Black Widowers club. He is a member of the Baker Street Irregulars, but he has never contributed an article on the subject of Sherlock Holmes, and this omission is causing him increasing embarrassment. He is determined to write something about The Dynamics of an Asteroid, but as he does not know very much about astronomy he has not been able to, so he appeals to the Black Widowers for their help.

The Black Widowers suggest various ideas, none of which are satisfactory. Finally Henry, the waiter, proposes a solution which meets with the approval of everyone, and which Mason decides to use. Henry's conclusion, which he works out from the title of Moriarty's treatise, the presumed date of publication (around 1875), and what was known about astronomy at the time, is that Moriarty must have written that the likely origin of the asteroid belt between Mars and Jupiter was a planet which exploded in the distant past. Henry further postulates that Moriarty may have intended to repeat such an event by calculating how to destroy Earth in a similar manner — the ultimate crime — and that for this reason the horrified scientific community, on finally realising what Moriarty had written, suppressed his work.
