= Thiotimoline =

Fictional organic compound from short stories by Isaac Asimov

"The Endochronic Properties of Resublimated Thiotimoline"
- Short story by Isaac Asimov
- Country: United States
- Language: English
- Genre: Science fiction

Publication
- Published in: Astounding Science Fiction
- Publisher: Street & Smith
- Media type: Magazine
- Publication date: March 1948
- Series: Thiotimoline

"The Micropsychiatric Applications of Thiotimoline"
- Short story by Isaac Asimov
- Country: United States
- Language: English
- Genre: Science fiction

Publication
- Published in: Astounding Science Fiction
- Publisher: Street & Smith
- Media type: Magazine
- Publication date: December 1953
- Series: Thiotimoline

"Thiotimoline and the Space Age"
- Short story by Isaac Asimov
- Country: United States
- Language: English
- Genre: Science fiction

Publication
- Published in: Analog Science Fiction and Fact
- Publisher: Street & Smith
- Media type: Magazine
- Publication date: October 1960
- Series: Thiotimoline

"Thiotimoline to the Stars"
- Short story by Isaac Asimov
- Country: United States
- Language: English
- Genre: Science fiction

Publication
- Published in: Astounding
- Publisher: Random House
- Media type: Print (Hardback)
- Publication date: 1973
- Series: Thiotimoline

Thiotimoline is a fictitious chemical compound conceived by American biochemist and science fiction author Isaac Asimov. It was first described in a spoof scientific paper titled "The Endochronic Properties of Resublimated Thiotimoline" in 1948. The major peculiarity of the chemical is its "endochronicity": it starts dissolving before it makes contact with water.

Asimov went on to write three additional short stories, each describing different properties or uses of thiotimoline.

== Chemical properties ==
In Asimov's writings the endochronicity of thiotimoline is explained by the fact that in the thiotimoline molecule, there is at least one carbon atom such that, while two of the carbon's four chemical bonds lie in normal space and time, one of the bonds projects into the future and another into the past. Thiotimoline is derived from the bark of the (fictitious) shrub Rosacea karlsbadensis rufo, and the thiotimoline molecule includes at least fourteen hydroxy groups, two amino groups, and one sulfonic acid group, and possibly one nitro compound group as well. The nature of the hydrocarbon nucleus is unknown, although it seems in part to be an aromatic hydrocarbon.

== Background ==
In 1947 Asimov was engaged in doctoral research in chemistry and, as part of his experimental procedure, he needed to dissolve catechol in water. As he observed the crystals dissolve as soon as they hit the water's surface, it occurred to him that if catechol were any more soluble, then it would dissolve before it encountered the water.

By that time Asimov had been writing professionally for nine years and would soon write a doctoral dissertation. He feared that the experience of writing readable prose for publication (i.e. science fiction) might have impaired his ability to write the turgid prose typical of academic discourse, and decided to practice with a spoof article (including charts, graphs, tables, and citations of fake articles in nonexistent journals) describing experiments on a compound, thiotimoline, that was so soluble that it dissolved in water up to 1.12 seconds before the water was added.

Asimov wrote the article on 8 June 1947, but was uncertain as to whether the resulting work of fiction was publishable. John W. Campbell, the editor of Astounding Science Fiction, accepted it for publication on 10 June, agreeing to Asimov's request that it appear under a pseudonym in deference to Asimov's concern that he might alienate potential doctoral examiners at Columbia University if he were revealed as the author.

Some months later Asimov was alarmed to see the piece appear in the March 1948 issue of Astounding under his own name, and copies of the issue circulated at the Columbia chemistry department. Asimov believed that Campbell had done so out of greater wisdom. His examiners told him that they accepted his dissertation by asking a final question about thiotimoline, resulting in him having to be led from the room while laughing hysterically with relief. The article made Asimov famous for the first time outside science fiction, as chemists shared copies of the article. He heard that many children went to the New York Public Library trying to find the nonexistent journals.

== "The Micropsychiatric Applications of Thiotimoline" ==
In 1952, Asimov wrote a second spoof scientific paper on thiotimoline called "The Micropsychiatric Applications of Thiotimoline". Like the first, it included charts, graphs, tables, and citations of fake articles from fake journals (along with one real citation: Asimov's own earlier spoof article from Astounding, which was listed tongue-in-cheek as the Journal of Astounding Science Fiction). This second article described the use of thiotimoline to establish a quantitative classification of "certain mental disorders". It also expounds a putative rationale for thiotimoline's behaviour: namely that the chemical bonds in the compound's structural formula are so starved of space that some are forced into the time dimension. According to the second article, thiotimoline's time of solubility varies depending on the determination of the person adding the water. It also claims that one effect is that when people with multiple personalities add the water, some parts of the thiotimoline dissolve before others, due to some of the individual's personalities being more determined than others. "The Micropsychiatric Applications of Thiotimoline" appeared in the December 1953 issue of Astounding.

The first two thiotimoline "articles" appeared together in Asimov's first collection of science essays, Only a Trillion (1957), under the joint title "The Marvellous Properties of Thiotimoline". Asimov also included the original article in his 1972 collection The Early Asimov. The first article also appeared in Fifty Years of the Best Science Fiction from Analog (Davis Publications, 1982).

== "Thiotimoline and the Space Age" ==
Asimov wrote a third thiotimoline article on 14 November 1959 called "Thiotimoline and the Space Age". Instead of a fake scientific paper, this third article took the form of an address by Asimov to the 12th annual meeting of the American Chronochemical Society, a nonexistent scientific society. In his address, Asimov "describes" his first experiments with thiotimoline in July 1947, and timing the compound's dissolution with the original endochronometer, "the same instrument now at the Smithsonian". Asimov laments the skepticism with which chronochemistry has been greeted in America, noting with sorrow that his address has only attracted fifteen attendees. He then contrasts the thriving state of chronochemistry in the Soviet Union, with the research town of Khrushchevsk, nicknamed "Tiotimolingrad", established in the Urals.

According to Asimov, two Scottish researchers have developed a "telechronic battery", which uses a series of 77,000 interconnected endochronometers to allow a final sample of thiotimoline to dissolve up to a day before water is added to an initial sample. Asimov says there is "strong, if indirect, evidence that the Soviet Union possesses even more sophisticated devices and is turning them out in commercial quantities". He believes that the Soviets are using telechronic batteries to determine ahead of time whether satellite launches will be successful.

Finally, Asimov describes attempts to create a "Heisenberg failure", to get a sample of thiotimoline to dissolve without later adding water to it. In every case where the thiotimoline dissolved, some accident occurred that caused some water to be added to it at the proper time. Several attempts to create a Heisenberg failure in the mid-1950s coincided with hurricanes Carol, Edna, and Diane striking New England in such a manner as to suggest that nature would find a way to add water whatever man decided, if man were to be resolute in not adding water. Asimov speculated that Noah's flood might have been brought about by thiotimoline experiments among the ancient Sumerians. He then concludes with some speculation about thiotimoline's potential applications as a weapon of mass destruction by deliberately using it to artificially induce hurricanes.

"Thiotimoline and the Space Age" appeared in the October 1960 issue of Astounding, which was then in the final stages of changing its name to Analog. The article was reprinted in full in Opus 100 (1969) and The Asimov Chronicles: Fifty Years of Isaac Asimov (1989).

== "Thiotimoline to the Stars" ==
Asimov's final piece on thiotimoline was a short story titled "Thiotimoline to the Stars", which he wrote for Harry Harrison's anthology Astounding (1973). In it, Admiral Vernon, Commandant of the Astronautic Academy, gives a speech to the graduating "Class of '22". Vernon's speech explains that thiotimoline was first mentioned in 1948 by a semi-mythical scientist named Azimuth or Asymptote, but that serious study of the compound didn't begin until the 21st century scientist Almirante worked out the theory of hypersteric hindrance. Later scientists worked out ways to form endochronic molecules into polymers, allowing large structures such as spaceships to be built out of endochronic materials. One effect of endochronicity is that if one fails to add water to an object that has reacted to water, the object will travel into the future in search of water to interact with.

An individual with sufficient inborn talent, Vernon explains, can perfectly balance a starship's endochronicity with relativistic time dilation, so that a ship traveling at relativistic speeds can age at the same rate as the rest of the universe, allowing it to return to its starting point within months, rather than centuries, of its departure. Vernon emphasizes that starship pilots are expected to match endochronicity with relativity exactly: a sixty-second difference between the two is regarded as barely acceptable, and a 120-second difference is considered grounds for dismissal. Vernon also emphasizes that endochronic molecules are unstable, and must be renewed before each trip, so that an endochronic ship that finds itself lost might not have sufficient endochronicity to return to its proper time. A ship that finds itself in the future might be able to re-endochronize itself if the technology still exists; a ship that finds itself in the past will be marooned there.

Finally, Vernon reveals that the auditorium where he is giving his speech is actually an endochronic starship, and that during his speech, they have all flown to the outskirts of the Solar System. The graduates felt no acceleration because canceling out time dilation also caused the canceling out of inertia. When Vernon concludes his speech, the graduates will be landing in the United Nations Port at Lincoln, Nebraska, where they will be spending the weekend.

After they land, Vernon receives an awful shock and passes out when his pilot informs him that the ship is surrounded by Indians. Vernon wrongly assumed the pilot meant Red Indians, and thought that they had landed centuries in the past. But the pilot only meant that they had landed at the correct time but near Calcutta, India.

Asimov included "Thiotimoline to the Stars" in his 1975 collection Buy Jupiter and Other Stories.

== Other references to thiotimoline ==
In Glen Bever's story "And Silently Vanish Away" a chemist with the unique ability to use psychokinetic catalysis to speed up difficult reactions is shocked by a lab explosion and the mixture he was working on gets changed. Under analysis the structure never appears to be the same twice and when the substance is injected into lab rats they start to silently and suddenly vanish. It is found that one part of the compound is a molecule which spreads out into four dimensions. The four-dimensional molecule is thiotimoline. The story appeared in the November 1971 issue of Analog Science Fiction/Science Fact.

Topi H. Barr's story "Antithiotimoline" deals with a chemist who accidentally creates a thiotimoline-like compound which extrudes only into the past, enabling the scientist to create images of past events. The narrator complains that thiotimoline is extremely difficult to obtain, and suspects that the CIA or other agencies are controlling the supply for their own reasons. The story appeared in the December 1977 issue of Analog.

Spider Robinson's story "Mirror mirror, off the wall", published in Time Travelers Strictly Cash in 1981, also references thiotimoline.

In Robert Silverberg's 1989 story "The Asenion Solution", thiotimoline is used to send excess quantities of plutonium-186 to the end of time, where they will fall over the brink into anti-time and lead to the Big Bang. "The Asenion Solution" appeared in the Asimov festschrift Foundation's Friends.

The November/December 2001 and March/April 2002 issues of the IEEE Design & Test of Computers included spoof articles on the use of thiotimoline for debugging computers.

In the game We Happy Few, a mysterious liquid called "motilene" acts as the primary source of electrical power in the setting, and is pumped throughout the city in pipes in lieu of a traditional electrical grid, or alternatively placed into special jars to act as portable batteries. A research note can be found in one location which makes reference to "thiomotilene crystals" and their "endochronic properties", which in turn strongly suggests motilene's name be derived from thiotimoline.

== See also ==
- Tachyons in fiction
- List of fictional elements, materials, isotopes and atomic particles
- "Pâté de Foie Gras", another Asimov scientific spoof about a goose which actually laid golden eggs
