= Puzzles of the Black Widowers =

1990 collection of mystery short stories by Isaac Asimov

- Cover of first edition, 1990
- Author: Isaac Asimov
- Cover artist: James Steinberg
- Language: English
- Series: Black Widowers
- Genre: Mystery
- Publisher: Doubleday
- Publication date: 1990
- Publication place: United States
- Media type: Print (hardcover)
- Pages: 253
- ISBN: 0-385-26264-7
- OCLC: 19625924
- Dewey Decimal: 813/.54 20
- LC Class: PS3551.S5 P8 1990
- Preceded by: Banquets of the Black Widowers
- Followed by: The Return of the Black Widowers

Puzzles of the Black Widowers is a collection of mystery short stories by American author Isaac Asimov, featuring his fictional club of mystery solvers, the Black Widowers. It was first published in hardcover by Doubleday in January 1990, and in paperback by Bantam Books the same year. The first British edition was issued in hardcover by Doubleday (UK) in April 1990, and the first British paperback edition by Bantam UK in April 1991.

This book is the fifth of six that describe mysteries solved by the Black Widowers, based on a literary dining club he belonged to known as the Trap Door Spiders. It collects twelve stories by Asimov, nine reprinted from mystery magazines and three previously unpublished, together with a general introduction and an afterword by the author following each story. Each story involves the club members' knowledge of trivia.

== Contents ==
- Introduction
- "The Fourth Homonym" (1985)
- "Unique Is Where You Find It" (1985)
- "The Lucky Piece" (1990)
- "Triple Devil" (1985)
- "Sunset on the Water" (1986)
- "Where Is He?" (1986)
- "The Old Purse" (1987)
- "The Quiet Place" (1988)
- "The Four-Leaf Clover" (1990)
- "The Envelope" (1989)
- "The Alibi" (1989)
- "The Recipe" (1990)
