= Through a Glass, Clearly =

- First edition
- Author: Isaac Asimov
- Cover artist: Josh Kirby
- Genre: Science fiction
- Publisher: Four Square Books
- Publication date: 1967
- Publication place: United Kingdom
- Pages: 124

Through a Glass, Clearly (1967) is a collection of four science fiction novelettes by American writer Isaac Asimov. This book was only published in the United Kingdom, and not in the United States or Canada, and has generally not been available there. Its four stories were all published in other Asimov short story collections.

== Contents ==
- "It's Such a Beautiful Day" (1954)
- "Belief" (1953)
- "Breeds There a Man...?" (1951)
- "C-Chute" (1951)
