= Magic (short story collection) =

1996 collection of short stories and essays by Isaac Asimov

- Cover of the first edition, published by Harper Prism.
- Author: Isaac Asimov
- Language: English
- Publication date: 1996

Magic (1996) is a collection of short stories and essays by American writer Isaac Asimov, all within (or concerning, in the latter case) the fantasy genre, collected and released after his death. The first seven stories are part of his Azazel series, while the remainder are three more traditional medieval fantasies and one mystery story from Asimov's Black Widowers series.

== Contents ==
- "Introduction", essay
- "Part One: The Final Fantasy Stories", short stories:
  - "To Your Health" (1989), Azazel series
  - "The Critic on the Hearth" (1992), Azazel series
  - "It's a Job" (1991), Azazel series
  - "Baby, It's Cold Outside" (1991), Azazel series
  - "The Time Traveler" (1990), Azazel series
  - "Wine Is a Mocker" (1990), Azazel series
  - "The Mad Scientist" (1989), Azazel series
  - "The Fable of the Three Princes" (1987), novelette
  - "March Against the Foe" (1994), Azazel series
  - "Northwestward" (1989), Black Widowers series
  - "Prince Delightful and the Flameless Dragon" (1991)
- "Part Two: On Fantasy", essays:
  - "Magic" (1985)
  - "Sword and Sorcery" (1986)
  - "Concerning Tolkien" (1991)
  - "In Days of Old" (1985)
  - "Giants in the Earth" (1985)
  - "When Fantasy Became Fantasy" (1982)
  - "The Reluctant Critic" (1978)
  - "The Unicorn" (1986)
  - "Unknown" (1987)
  - "Extraordinary Voyages" (1978)
  - "Fairy Tales" (1985)
  - "Dear Judy-Lynn" (1986)
  - "Fantasy" (1984)
- "Part Three: Beyond Fantasy", essays:
  - "Reading and Writing" (1990)
  - "The Right Answer" (1996)
  - "Ignorance in America" (1989)
  - "Knock Plastic!" (1989)
  - "Lost in Non-Translation" (1972)
  - "Look Long Upon a Monkey" (1974)
  - "Thinking About Thinking" (1975)
- "Copyright Notices", essay
