= Star Light (short story) =

"Star Light" is a science fiction short story by American writer Isaac Asimov. It was first published in the October 1962 issue of Scientific American and reprinted in Asimov's 1968 collection Asimov's Mysteries.

== Plot summary ==
Arthur Trent is a starship pilot and the young accomplice of Brennmeyer, an elderly and brilliant researcher. Brennmeyer has been planning a crime for thirty years. They have stolen a quantity of a valuable substance called krillium that is needed to build robots, and can be sold for millions on any civilized world. Due to the size of the galaxy and the lack of any central government, no cooperation between police of different planets is possible except for the closest ones. So, as long as they are far enough from the point of origin, no search shall be possible; nor shall there be any reason for the locals to believe that the krillium was illegally obtained.

Brennmeyer has compiled extensive data on stars and inhabited planets for many thousands of light-years around. He plans a randomly directed jump through hyperspace, which shall place them well beyond the reach of the police. Then, another jump shall be made toward the closest planet in Brennmeyer's database. (They shall jump randomly because the time required to compute an ordinary jump is long enough that the police would catch them before the computation was complete, and also because there shall be no chance of anyone knowing their destination.) He has engaged Trent to pilot their getaway ship, since he cannot do so himself. Trent, however, does not wish to share the wealth. He murders Brennmeyer with a knife and flees by himself, confident that the ship's automatic search-and-compare program shall locate a usable star and planet for him. He leaves all the evidence for the police to find, since he is sure that they shall not be able to catch him.

He makes the jump, then waits for the computer to match the local stars to its stored patterns, based on its selection of a bright, nearby star. Much time elapses, however, without a match being found. Trent realizes, to his horror, that the star must be a recent nova, which distorts the pattern into one that the computer shall never be able to find in its maps. He lacks the knowledge to override the search procedure, and his life support shall not last indefinitely. The story ends with Trent wishing that he had kept the knife.
