= More Tales of the Black Widowers =

1976 collection of mystery short stories by Isaac Asimov

- Cover of first edition, 1976
- Author: Isaac Asimov
- Cover artist: Lawrence Ratzkin
- Language: English
- Series: Black Widowers
- Genre: Mystery
- Publisher: Doubleday
- Publication date: 1976
- Publication place: United States
- Media type: Print (hardcover)
- Preceded by: Tales of the Black Widowers
- Followed by: Casebook of the Black Widowers

More Tales of the Black Widowers is a collection of mystery short stories by American author Isaac Asimov, featuring his fictional club of mystery solvers, the Black Widowers. It was first published in hardcover by Doubleday in October 1976, and in paperback by the Fawcett Crest imprint of Ballantine Books in November 1977. The first British edition was issued by Gollancz in April 1977.

This book is the second of six that describe mysteries solved by the Black Widowers, based on a literary dining club he belonged to known as the Trap Door Spiders. It collects twelve stories by Asimov, nine reprinted from mystery or science fiction magazines and three previously unpublished, together with a general introduction, and an afterword following each story by the author. Each story involves the club members' knowledge of trivia.

== Contents ==
- "Introduction"
- "When No Man Pursueth"—The guest, Mortimer Stellar, is based on Asimov himself. The title phrase was taken from the King James Version of the Bible, Book of Proverbs 28:1: "The wicked flee when no man pursueth: but the righteous are bold as a lion."
- "Quicker Than the Eye"
- "The Iron Gem"
- "The Three Numbers"
- "Nothing Like Murder"
- "No Smoking"
- "Season's Greetings!"
- "The One and Only East"
- "Earthset and Evening Star" (first published in Fantasy and Science Fiction (August 1976) pages 110-124)
- "Friday the Thirteenth"
- "The Unabridged"
- "The Ultimate Crime"
