= Sixty Million Trillion Combinations =

1980 short mystery story by Isaac Asimov

"Sixty Million Trillion Combinations" is a short mystery story by American writer Isaac Asimov. It was first published in the May 5, 1980, issue of Ellery Queen's Mystery Magazine under the title "64 Million Trillion Combinations," and reprinted in Banquets of the Black Widowers (1984) and The Return of the Black Widowers (2003). Asimov originally entitled it "Fourteen Letters", but a variant of the magazine's title was used in subsequent publications of the story. The story is one of a collection of short mysteries whose characters are based loosely upon the Trap Door Spiders, a stag-club of which Asimov was a member.

== Plot summary ==
Each month, the seven men who make up the Black Widowers (six who dine, and the waiter who attends them) meet at a fine restaurant and converse over dinner with each other, their guest, and their waiter, Henry. The host of the group—that is, the member who pays for everyone else's dinner that month—usually brings a guest for the evening, who will then be "grilled," or questioned, when dessert has been finished and supper has reached the brandy stage. This occasion is different, as Thomas Trumbull, one of the members, wants to present to the others a problem he faces at work.

Trumbull works for the U.S. government in a mysterious capacity; it is known, though, that he is involved in cryptanalysis.

As usual, the Black Widowers have discussed, during the pre-supper cocktails, a matter that will appear important later: the apparently unimportant subject of alliteration, or, to be more precise, first letters.

Trumbull explains that his department is concerned with the important computations and, subsequently, the paranoia of a mathematician, Vladimir Pochik, who suspects that his work on Goldbach's conjecture has been stolen. Trumbull also confesses that he feels rather as though he is in the position of the wise men facing Nebuchadnezzar II. By this, he means that, instead of solving a known cryptogram, he must figure out what the cryptogram is.

Pochik, a former restaurant waiter (like Henry), had been a brilliant mathematician. He had been happily working with the authorities until another mathematician, Sandino, became his rival, and an insulting, harassing rival at that—always teasing him about having started work as a waiter, for instance. To Pochik's vast dismay, Sandino publishes an article showing the same work that Pochik had done, and Pochik is certain that Sandino stole the work.

At that point, Pochik retires to his room and reads only poetry, especially William Wordsworth. When the authorities demand his cooperation, Pochik sulkily gives a clue to the code that protected his work on a shared computer; he had been certain that no one could possibly guess or deduce the code, which is made up of 14 letters.

The Black Widowers suggest various groups of 14 letters, such as VLADIMIR POCHIK and SIR ISAAC NEWTON, which might provide the clue, and which Sandino might easily have thought of in order to break into the computer and steal Pochik's work. But Trumbull takes out his pocket computer and computes, gloomily, that there are about 64 million trillion different possibilities for the code word, beginning with AAAAAAAAAAAAAA.

The Black Widowers deduce the code purely because one member shares a trait with Pochik. That member is Henry, the waiter, who focused on the fact that Pochik was reading Wordsworth. He suggests fourteen letters to Trumbull (W, E, A, L, T, M, D, I, T, E, B, I, A, T), and Trumbull leaps up and telephones Pochik, and discovers that Henry was right. But how did Henry know?

Henry explains that the number 14 suggested to him the number of lines in a sonnet. He recalled that a famous Wordsworth poem refers to the English poet John Milton, whose sonnet On His Blindness concludes with the famous line, "They also serve who only stand and wait." As a waiter, Henry felt sympathy for Pochik. The 14 letters are the first letters of each line of the sonnet, which thus returns us to the earlier conversation about alliteration.

== See also ==
"The Nine Billion Names of God" – 1953 short story by Arthur C. Clarke
