= Banquets of the Black Widowers =

1984 collection of mystery short stories by Isaac Asimov

- Cover of first edition, 1984
- Author: Isaac Asimov
- Language: English
- Series: Black Widowers
- Genre: Mystery
- Publisher: Doubleday, Fawcett Crest
- Publication date: 1984
- Publication place: United States
- Media type: Print (hardback & paperback)
- Pages: 212
- ISBN: 0-385-19541-9
- OCLC: 10403672
- Dewey Decimal: 813/.54 19
- LC Class: PS3551.S5 B3 1984
- Preceded by: Casebook of the Black Widowers
- Followed by: Puzzles of the Black Widowers

Banquets of the Black Widowers is a collection of mystery short stories by American writer Isaac Asimov featuring his fictional club of mystery solvers, the Black Widowers. It was first published in hardcover by Doubleday in September 1984, and in paperback by the Fawcett Crest imprint of Ballantine Books in June 1986. The first British edition was issued by Grafton in August 1986.

This book is the fourth of six that describe mysteries solved by the Black Widowers, based on a literary dining club he belonged to known as the Trap Door Spiders. It collects twelve stories by Asimov, together with a general introduction and an afterword by the author following each story. Nine of the stories were previously published; "The Driver," "The Wrong House" and "The Intrusion" are new to this collection.

Each story involves the club members' knowledge of trivia. Nearly every story here is about decoding a riddle, each of which provides a clue based on dying or last words, misunderstood words, forgotten words, or withheld words. A few are based on facts that are, perhaps, not generally known to the public – Asimov was a frequent writer of popular science and his inclination to explain anything and everything for the general public carried over into other fields, such as history and sociology – but all the mysteries play fair with the reader, who is given either enough information to figure out the solution or a satisfying conclusion that is based on previously given facts and personality qualities.

== Contents ==
- "Introduction"
- "Sixty Million Trillion Combinations" (Ellery Queen's Mystery Magazine, 5 May 1980) – A paranoid mathematician who suspects that his work on Goldbach's conjecture has been stolen. When the authorities demand his cooperation, he sulkily gives a clue to the code which protects his work on a shared computer, suspecting that no one could possibly guess or deduce the code. Fortunately for the agencies who need this information, the Black Widowers are able to come up with the code, purely because one member shares a trait with the mathematician.
- "The Woman in the Bar" (Ellery Queen's Mystery Magazine, 30 June 1980) – the Black Widowers have as their dinner guest Darius Just, the main character from Asimov's mystery novel Murder at the ABA. Darius finds himself in danger of violent reprisals when he tries to help a frightened woman (he knows she is frightened, but he can have no idea by whom or why). She has given him crucial nonverbal communication clues which the Black Widowers solve. Asimov states that he "thought up" this Black Widowers story just for this character.
- "The Driver" – the Black Widowers consider the mysterious death of a chauffeur at a SETI Institute conference.
- "The Good Samaritan" (Ellery Queen's Mystery Magazine, 10 September 1980) – in a controversial break with tradition, a woman is invited to attend the men-only club.
- "The Year of the Action" (Ellery Queen's Mystery Magazine, 1 January 1981) – a historical clue is solved about a comic opera, "The Pirates of Penzance," by Gilbert and Sullivan.
- "Can You Prove It?" (Ellery Queen's Mystery Magazine, 17 June 1981) – the guest describes his arrest and interrogation behind the Iron Curtain and is unable to explain why he was released.
- "The Phoenician Bauble" (Ellery Queen's Mystery Magazine, May 1982) – a valuable archaeological artefact has been lost.
- "A Monday in April" (Ellery Queen's Mystery Magazine, May 1983) – concerns a matter of trivia about ancient Rome. The evenings guest feels that his girlfriend cheated in a competition, but Henry's solution casts doubt on that presumption.
- "Neither Brute Nor Human" (Ellery Queen's Mystery Magazine, April 1984) – the story requires solving a riddle about a poem by Edgar Allan Poe.
- "The Redhead" (Ellery Queen's Mystery Magazine, October 1984) – a woman disappears into thin air.
- "The Wrong House" – the guest is unable to determine which of his neighbours has been counterfeiting money after witnessing their operation while drunk.
- "The Intrusion" – an uninvited guest crashes the party and asks the Black Widowers for help in finding the man who took advantage of his developmentally challenged sister.

== Reception ==
Dave Langford reviewed Banquets of the Black Widowers for White Dwarf #70, and stated that "I like detective stories, but Asimov tries the patience with trivial, moronic 'puzzles'."

== Reviews ==
- Review by Tom A. Jones (1985) in Vector 129
- Review by Phil Nichols (1986) in Paperback Inferno, #63
