= Science World (magazine) =

- Categories: Classroom magazine
- Frequency: Monthly
- Founded: 1957
- Company: Scholastic
- Country: United States
- Based in: New York City
- Language: English
- Website: scienceworld.scholastic.com
- ISSN: 0036-8601

Science World is an educational magazine published by Scholastic Corporation targeting primarily children between grades 6 and 12 and covering many aspects of science, including "physical science, life science/health, earth and space science, environmental science, and technology."

== History and profile ==
Science World was established in 1957 by Street & Smith Publications, Inc. In 1959, Scholastic Magazines, Inc. acquired the title. The magazine is based in New York City.

According to the Massachusetts Biotechnology Industry directory, Science World, "brings to life the latest breaking news and discoveries in every field of science, while helping students build critical-thinking and problem-solving skills." They are used in many schools, though a subscription is needed to obtain them.
