= The Winds of Change and Other Stories =

- First edition, cover art by Kiyoshi Kanai
- Author: Isaac Asimov
- Language: English
- Publication date: 1983

The Winds of Change and Other Stories is a collection of short stories by American writer Isaac Asimov, published in 1983 by Doubleday.

== Contents ==
- "About Nothing" (1975)
- "A Perfect Fit" (1981)
- "Belief" (1953), novelette
- "Death of a Foy" (1980)
- "Fair Exchange?" (1978)
- "For the Birds" (1980)
- "Found!" (1978)
- "Good Taste" (1976), novelette
- "How It Happened" (1979)
- "Ideas Die Hard" (1957), novelette
- "Ignition Point!" (1981)
- "It Is Coming" (1979), Multivac series
- "The Last Answer" (1980)
- "The Last Shuttle" (1981)
- "Lest We Remember" (1982), novelette
- "Nothing for Nothing" (1979)
- "One Night of Song" (1982), Azazel series
- "The Smile That Loses" (1982), Azazel series
- "Sure Thing" (1977)
- "To Tell at a Glance" (1983; previously published in an edited version in 1977), novelette
- "The Winds of Change" (1982)

== Reception ==
Dave Langford reviewed The Winds of Change for White Dwarf #58, and stated that "Thankfully there are a few good pieces; but it's tragic that the title story, whose subject Asimov considers vitally important (he's right), should be ruined by incredibly ham-handed telling."

== Sources ==
- Isaac Asimov, The Winds of Change, Granada 1983/ Panther, 1984/Doubleday 1984, ISBN 0-586-05743-9
