= Breeds There a Man...? =

1951 science fiction short story by Isaac Asimov

- Short story by Isaac Asimov
- Country: United States
- Language: English
- Genre: Science fiction

Publication
- Published in: Astounding Science Fiction
- Publication type: Periodical
- Publisher: Street & Smith
- Media type: Print (Magazine, Hardback & Paperback)
- Publication date: June 1951

"Breeds There a Man...?" is a science fiction short story by American writer Isaac Asimov. It was first published in the June 1951 issue of Astounding and was reprinted in science fiction anthologies such as Beachheads in Space (1952) and The Great SF Stories #13 (1951) (published in 1985), as well as in Asimov-only collections such as Through a Glass, Clearly (1967), Nightfall and Other Stories (1969), and Robot Dreams (1986).

== Plot summary ==
Elwood Ralson, a brilliant but psychologically disturbed physicist, becomes convinced that humanity is a kind of genetics experiment being run by an alien intelligence. His behaviour becomes more erratic and suicidal as his thoughts become more entrenched in this idea, and his health fails.

He draws an analogy between human progress and the growth of bacteria that suggests that humanity has been bred in certain strains for various traits (e.g. artistic ability) and that such breeding is what produced the Athens of Pericles and the Renaissance. He further states that the experimenters use a penicillin ring, or killing boundary, that makes humans want to kill themselves should their abilities grow too great, as mental increase leads to greater "infectivity," and humanity is dangerous to the experimenters. The most recent strain began with the Industrial Revolution, and its development for over a century has made it extremely dangerous. Therefore, the theoretical experimenters intend to use the atomic bomb to incite industrialized nations to kill each other. He claims that the aliens are exerting pressure on his mind to kill himself before he can help produce a defence against atomic weapons, since such a defence would protect humanity against a planned extinction at the hands of the aliens.

Under the care of psychiatrist Dr. Blaustein, Ralson is able to safely provide piecemeal guidance to other scientists carrying out his research. Once the experiment is complete and the defence (a force field generator) is built and successfully tested, he commits suicide. Later, the man who assembled the force field generator, who never spoke to Ralson and did not know about his beliefs, also kills himself.

== Reception ==
Stating that the story "provided a poignant insight into the emotional stress and sense of isolation of many of the best theoretical scientists", Carl Sagan in 1978 listed "Breeds There a Man...?" as among the "rare few science-fiction [works that] combine a standard science-fiction theme with a deep human sensitivity".

== Notes ==
The title is taken from the phrase "Breathes there a man..." in Sir Walter Scott's 1805 poem "The Lay of the Last Minstrel".

Asimov said in Nightfall and Other Stories (1969), "I resisted the temptation to base a story slavishly on the present until I could think of a way to do so without making myself a minion of the headlines and of topicality. I wanted to write a story that would deal with the things of tomorrow without becoming outdated the day after tomorrow". He believed that "Breeds There a Man...?" "despite all its topicality, is as much science fiction now [1969] as it was in 1951 when it was written".

Asimov said in In Memory Yet Green, "I thought it was a particularly good story. It was set in the near future and dealt with current problems—the need to work up a defense against the atom bomb—which is something I don't usually do."
