= Eyes Do More Than See =

- Short story by Isaac Asimov
- Country: United States
- Language: English
- Genre: Science fiction

Publication
- Published in: The Magazine of Fantasy and Science Fiction
- Publication type: Periodical
- Publisher: Fantasy House
- Media type: Print (Magazine, Hardback & Paperback)
- Publication date: April 1965

"Eyes Do More Than See" is a science fiction short story by American writer Isaac Asimov.

== Background ==
In 1964, Playboy magazine approached several science fiction writers to create short-short stories based on a photograph of a clay head without ears. The selected stories — Arthur C. Clarke's "Playback", Frederik Pohl's "Lovemaking", and Thomas M. Disch's "Cephalatron" (later "Fun with Your New Head") — were published in the December 1966 issue.

Playboy had rejected Asimov's story, so he submitted it to the Magazine of Fantasy and Science Fiction, which published it in April 1965. The story has since been anthologized several times and was included in Asimov's collection Nightfall and Other Stories (1969).

The story was nominated for the 1966 Nebula Award for Best Short Story.

== Plot summary ==
In the very distant future — about a trillion years in the future — humans have long since abandoned physical form. They exist as energy entities spanning space.

Two of these entities, known only as Ames and Brock, tire of artistic competitions using manipulations of energy. They discuss a new project in which they attempt to manipulate physical matter, and Ames creates a sculpture of a human head. Brock, who was once a woman, is painfully reminded of her physical past and that she once knew love. She adds tears to the head and then flees. Ames remembers that he had once been a man, and the force of his vortex splits the head as he turns in search of Brock.
