= Casebook of the Black Widowers =

1980 collection of mystery short stories by Isaac Asimov

- Cover of first edition, 1980
- Author: Isaac Asimov
- Language: English
- Series: Black Widowers
- Genre: Mystery
- Publisher: Doubleday
- Publication date: 1980
- Publication place: United States
- Media type: Print (hardcover)
- Pages: 182
- ISBN: 0-449-24384-2
- OCLC: 7412834
- Preceded by: More Tales of the Black Widowers
- Followed by: Banquets of the Black Widowers

Casebook of the Black Widowers is a collection of mystery short stories by American author Isaac Asimov, featuring his fictional club of mystery solvers, the Black Widowers. It was first published in hardcover by Doubleday in January 1980 and in paperback by the Fawcett Crest imprint of Ballantine Books in March 1981.

This book is the third of six in the Black Widowers series, based on a literary dining club he belonged to known as the Trap Door Spiders. It collects twelve stories by Asimov, nine reprinted from mystery magazines and three previously unpublished, together with a general introduction and an afterword by the author following each story. Each story involves the club members' knowledge of trivia.

== Contents ==
- "Introduction"
- "The Cross of Lorraine"
- "The Family Man"
- "The Sports Page"
- "Second Best"
- "The Missing Item"
- "The Next Day"
- "Irrelevance!"
- "None So Blind"
- "The Backward Look"
- "What Time Is It?"
- "Middle Name"
- "To the Barest"
