= The Billiard Ball =

1967 science fiction short story by Isaac Asimov

"The Billiard Ball" is a science fiction short story by American author Isaac Asimov, written in September 1966 and first published in the March 1967 issue of If. It appeared in Asimov's 1968 collection Asimov's Mysteries, in his 1973 collection The Best of Isaac Asimov, in his 1986 collection Robot Dreams and in The Complete Stories, Vol. 2.

== Plot summary ==
An example of what Asimov called his "late style," the story is a journalist's recollection of the events surrounding the discovery of an anti-gravity device in the mid-21st century. Heavy with physics theory, the story describes the relationship between the creator of the device, the billionaire inventor Edward Bloom, and his former classmate James Priss, a Nobel Prize-winning theoretical physicist who had developed most of the theory that made the device possible. The men are expert billiards players and bitter rivals. Challenged to execute a shot on a table which is equipped with the device, Priss sends a ball on a complicated trajectory, which finishes when it enters the device's field. At that point the ball vanishes and Bloom collapses, dead, with a mysterious hole drilled completely through his chest.

Central to the story is the concept of a pure anti-gravity machine that turns out to be a perpetual motion machine of the first order. Energy can be freely created in a volume of space time which is pulled "flat," as defined within the theory of relativity of Albert Einstein. However, this field possesses remarkable properties, which are the centerpiece of the story: any object which enters the field is reduced to zero mass, and hence must assume the speed of light. The story includea the unprovable speculation as to whether Priss knew, from his own theory and the nature of the blue glow produced by the field (possibly due to Cherenkov radiation), what would happen, and if he then directed the ball in such a way as to kill Bloom.

== Discussion ==
Asimov himself had some reservations about the name of the story, and noted that his friend Frederik Pohl's suggested title of "Dirty Pool" was far better than his own. The story retains its title despite the feeling of its author, as he preferred to remain consistent.
