= Boulding =

Boulding is a surname. Notable people with the surname include:

- Aaron Boulding (born 1972), American video game journalist
- Elise M. Boulding (1920–2010), Norwegian-American Quaker sociologist and wife of Kenneth E. Boulding
- Helen Boulding (born 1978), English singer-songwriter and sister of Michael and Rory Boulding
- Kenneth E. Boulding (1910–1993), English economist, and systems scientist, and husband of Elise Boulding
- Mary Boulding (1929–2009), English nun, translator and writer
- Michael Boulding (born 1976), English footballer and brother of Helen and Rory Boulding
- Rory Boulding (born 1988), English footballer and brother of Michael and Helen Boulding
- William Frederic Boulding (born 1955), American economist, professor and academic administrator

== See also ==
- Dorothy Celeste Boulding Ferebee (1898–1980), African-American physician and activist
- Kenneth Boulding's Evolutionary Perspective
