= USC Marshall School of Business =

Business school of the University of Southern California

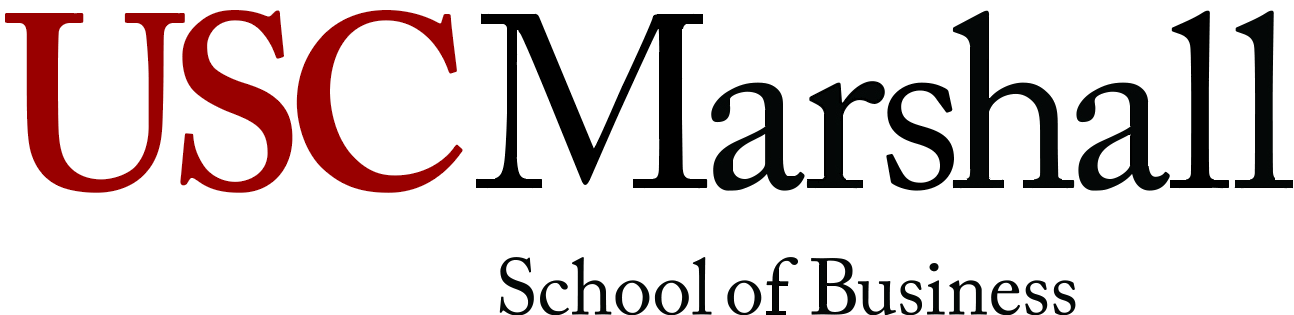
- Type: Private business school
- Established: 1920
- Parent institution: University of Southern California
- Academic affiliations: AACSB
- Dean: Geoffrey Garrett
- Faculty: 181
- Undergraduates: 5,440
- Doctoral students: 66
- Other students: 2,752
- Location: Los Angeles, California, U.S. 34.02051°N 118.28563°W
- Colors: Cardinal and Gold
- Website: www.marshall.usc.edu

The USC Marshall School of Business is the business school of the University of Southern California, a private research university in Los Angeles, California, United States. It is accredited by the Association to Advance Collegiate Schools of Business.

In 1997, the school was renamed following a $35 million donation from alumnus Gordon S. Marshall.

== History ==
The Marshall School began as the College of Commerce and Business Administration in 1920. The Graduate School of Business Administration was established in 1960. The Entrepreneurship Program, the first of its kind in the United States, was established in 1972 and is internationally recognized. It has now been renamed The Lloyd Greif Center for Entrepreneurial Studies. The Pacific RIM Education (PRIME) program was implemented in 1997 as the first ever MBA course of its kind to require all first year full-time MBA students to participate in an international experience.

The Leventhal School of Accounting was formed within the school on February 7, 1979. All of its classes are offered at the University Park campus in Los Angeles.

James G. Ellis was the dean from 2007 through June 30, 2019. The interim dean is Gareth James, the E. Morgan Stanley Chair in Business Administration, director of the Institute for Outlier Research in Business, and Professor of Data Sciences and Operations, who has held a number of roles in his more than 20 years at Marshall.

On June 11, 2019, it was announced that Geoffrey Garrett would be leaving the Wharton School of the University of Pennsylvania at the end of the 2019–2020 academic year to become dean of the Marshall School of Business. Garrett will begin his tenure as dean of Marshall in July 2020.

== Campus ==
The school occupies five multi-story buildings on campus: Hoffman Hall (HOH), Bridge Hall (BRI), the Accounting building (ACC), Popovich Hall (JKP) and Jill and Frank Fertitta Hall (JFF), which houses the Marshall School's undergraduate programs.

== Popovich hall ==
This is the main building of the Marshall School's MBA programs. The $20 million, 55,000 square feet (5,100 m^{2}) building opened in 1999 as one of the most technologically advanced business school buildings in the United States. It was named after alumni J. Kristofer Popovich and Jane Hoffman Popovich for their $5 million gift.

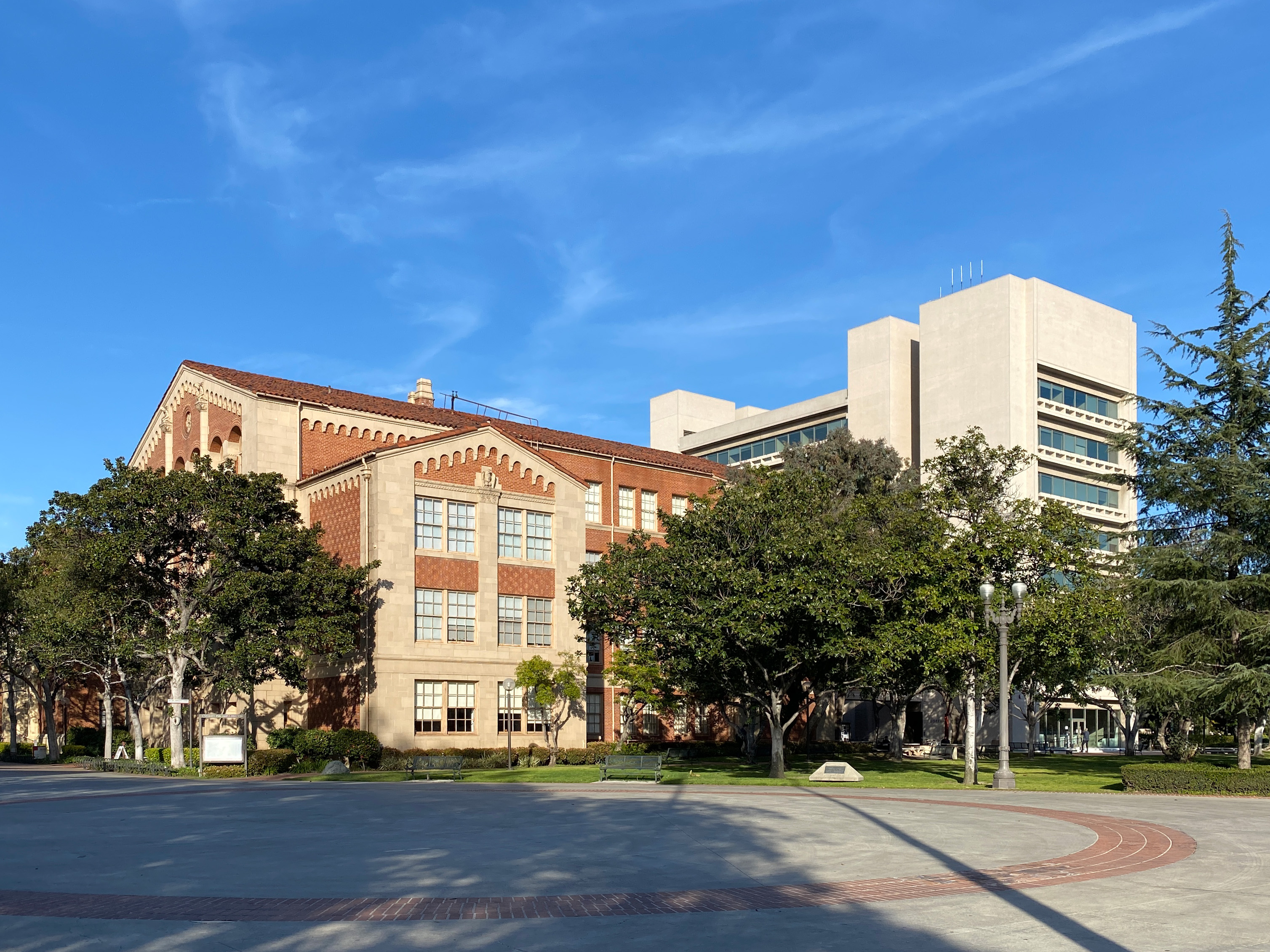
Bridge and Hoffman Hall of the Marshall School of Business

=== Bridge Hall ===
Bridge Hall (built in 1928) housed all undergraduate offices for the Marshall School of Business until the opening of Jill & Frank Fertitta Hall in the fall of 2016. Fertitta Hall, a 104,000-square-foot, five-story building, was built expressly for Marshall's undergraduate community. It houses USC Marshall's Undergraduate student services, admissions and advisors' offices. The Office of the Dean, staff offices and a few classrooms continue to be housed at Bridge Hall.

=== Hoffman Hall ===
The H. Leslie Hoffman Hall of Business Administration, which opened in 1973 and stands eight stories tall, is the former home of the Crocker Business Library (now renamed the Gaughan & Tiberti Library on the first floor of Fertitta Hall). It is named for H. Leslie Hoffman, father of Jane Hoffman Popovich. It was designed by architect I.M. Pei. The building was extensively renovated in 2015-16 into faculty offices.

== Academics ==
=== Undergraduate ===
The Marshall School offers a Bachelor of Science in Business Administration. There are several joint programs that offer studies with International Relations and Cinematic Arts in combination with Business Administration. New students take a business core and have other time to fulfill the USC Core and take elective classes with the option to earn one of nine emphases.

The undergraduate program offers a variety of international opportunities. The Global Leadership Program (GLP) comprises a two-semester seminar on business leadership in China and a spring break trip to China.

=== Graduate ===
Marshall's two-year full-time MBA comprises an intensive core and a range of electives and concentrations. USC Marshall offers an MBA program for Professionals and Managers (MBA-PM), an online MBA (OMBA), an executive MBA (EMBA), and a one-year international MBA (IBEAR). The school also offers 11 specialty master's degrees.

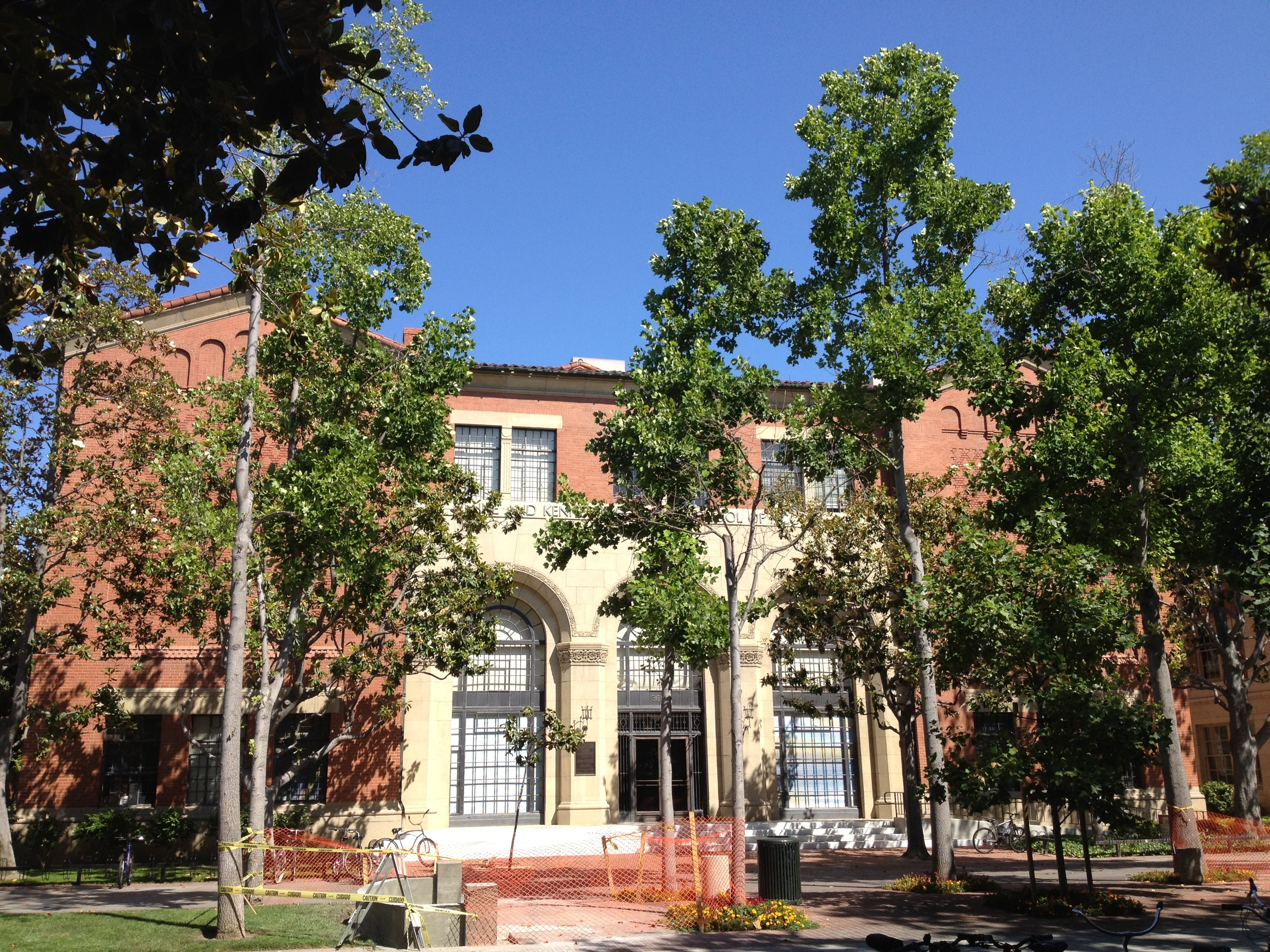
Leventhal School of Accounting

The Marshall School also offers a full-time doctoral program within the five academic departments. The program generally lasts 4–5 years with up to two years of dissertation. Along working with notable faculty, doctoral students also receive substantial financial aid, such as graduate assistantship and a living stipend, during their study.

=== Executive education ===
Marshall Executive Education offers open enrollment programming with business certificate programs – online and in-person – geared towards professional and personal development.

== Alumni ==
The Marshall School has more than 82,000 alumni worldwide in 123 countries.

== Hayes Barnard Sustainability Fellowship ==
In 2021, the USC Marshall School of Business launched the Hayes Barnard Sustainability Fellowship, an initiative designed to support MBA students who demonstrate a strong commitment to sustainable business practices. Funded by Hayes Barnard, the fellowship provides financial assistance to students working on sustainability-focused projects and research.

== Rankings ==
Business school rankings

United States
- QS MBA: 16
- Bloomberg MBA: 17
- USNWR MBA: 18

Global
- QS MBA: 36
- Financial Times MBA: 25

2023 QS Business Masters Rankings:

- Masters in Supply Chain Management - 5th in the world.
- Masters in Business Analytics - 9th in the world.
- Masters in Marketing - 16th in the world.
- Masters in Finance - 29th in the world.

2024 Poets and Quants:

- Undergraduate Program is 2nd in the US

== People ==
=== Notable alumni ===
- Dan Bane (B.S. '69) Chairman and CEO of Trader Joe's
- Marc Benioff (B.S. '86) Founder and CEO of Salesforce.com
- John Campbell (M.B.T. '77) United States Congressman
- Henry Caruso (B.S.) Founder of Dollar Rent-A-Car
- Alan Casden (B.S. '68) Chairman and CEO of Casden Properties
- Ronnie Chan (M.B.A) Chairman of Hang Lung Group and Hang Lung Properties in Hong Kong
- Yang Ho Cho (M.B.A. '79) President and CEO of Korean Airlines and Chairman of the Hanjin Group
- Chris DeWolfe (M.B.A. '97) Co-founder and CEO of MySpace
- Seymour Durst ('35), real estate investor and developer
- Vic Edelbrock, Jr. (B.S. '59) President and CEO of Edelbrock Automotive
- Charles Elachi (M.B.A. '78) Director of the Jet Propulsion Laboratory (JPL)
- Frank Fertitta III (B.S. '84) CEO of Station Casinos
- Robert M. Fomon (B.S. '51) Former Chairman and CEO of E. F. Hutton & Co. and governor of the New York Stock Exchange
- Pat Gillick (B.S. '58) General manager of the Philadelphia Phillies
- Ivan Glasenberg (M.B.A. '83) CEO of Glencore
- Henry C. Gordon (M.B.A. '66) X-20 Dyna-Soar astronaut
- Chris R. Hansen (M.B.A. '96) Founder of Valiant Capital Management
- Dean Heller (B.S. '85) United States Senator
- Tom Hicks (M.B.A. '70) Businessman and owner of English soccer team Liverpool F.C.
- Bradley Wayne Hughes (B.S. '57) Founder and CEO of Public Storage
- Jon Huntsman, Sr. (M.B.A.) Founder and Chairman of Huntsman Corporation; benefactor of the Huntsman School of Business
- Hyekyung "Shelly" Hwang (M.B.A.) Co-founder of Pinkberry
- Rob Kardashian (B.S. 2009) TV reality star
- Richard Knerr (B.S. '47) Co-founder and former president of Wham-O
- Lenny Krayzelburg (B.S. '98) Olympic gold medalist swimmer
- Terrence Lanni (B.S. '65) Chairman and CEO of MGM Mirage
- J. Sterling Livingston (B.S. '38) Author, management consultant and former professor at the Harvard Business School
- Paul Locatelli (Ph.D. '71) President and professor of accounting at Santa Clara University
- Rebecca Ma (B.S.) Founder of Hearth Wireless Chargers and Founder of Stupidpals
- Armen Margarian (B.S. 2001, M.B.A. 2006) - Co-founder and CEO of NexusLab Inc. (an Inc.5000 Company)
- Preston Martin (B.S. '47, M.B.A. '48) Founder of the PMI Mortgage Insurance Company; former Vice Chairman of the Federal Reserve Board
- Steve McIntosh (B.S. '84) Founder and president of Now & Zen, Inc.; writer in the field of integral theory
- Adam Milstein (M.B.A. '83) Real estate investor and philanthropist
- Anthony Muñoz (B.S. '76) Former National Football League offensive lineman
- Sheila Nazarian (MMM) plastic surgeon and television personality
- Pat Nixon (B.S. '37) Former First Lady
- Paul Orfalea (M.B.A. '71) Founder of Kinko's and benefactor of the Orfalea College of Business
- Mark Prior (B.S. '04) Major League Baseball pitcher
- Edward P. Roski (B.S. '62) Chairman and CEO of Majestic Realty Co., part owner of the Los Angeles Kings and Los Angeles Lakers
- Steve Saleen (B.S.) Founder and CEO of Saleen Performance, Inc.
- CJ Stubbs (‘19) Major League Baseball catcher for the Washington Nationals
- Michele Tafoya (M.B.A. '91) ESPN sportscaster
- Brian Teacher (born 1954; M.B.A.), world #7 tennis player
- Kevin Tsujihara (B.S. '86) CEO of Warner Bros.
- Ronald N. Tutor (B.S. '63) Chairman and CEO of Tutor Perini Corporation
- Ben Wanger (M.S. '20), American-Israeli Olympian, baseball pitcher, Team Israel
- Chelsea Zhang, (B.S. '17) actress
- Masagos Zulkifli (M.B.A. '95) Minister, Ministry of the Environment and Water Resources, Singapore

=== Faculty ===
- Richard B. Chase – Justin Dart Professorship in Operations Management
- Thomas W. Gilligan – E. Morgan Stanley Chair in Business Administration
- Lloyd Levitin – Professor of Finance
- Kenneth Merchant – Deloitte & Touche LLP Chair in Accountancy
- Ian Mitroff – Harold Quinton Distinguished Chair in Business Policy and Professor of Management and Organization
- Kevin J. Murphy – Kenneth L. Trefftzs Chair in Finance
- Kirk Snyder - Assistant Professor of Clinical Management Communication; expert on LGBT issues.
- Gerard Tellis – Jerry and Nancy Neely Chair in American Enterprise
- S. Mark Young – KPMG Foundation Professorship in Accounting, Marshall School of Business.
