= Joanne Smith =

American business executive

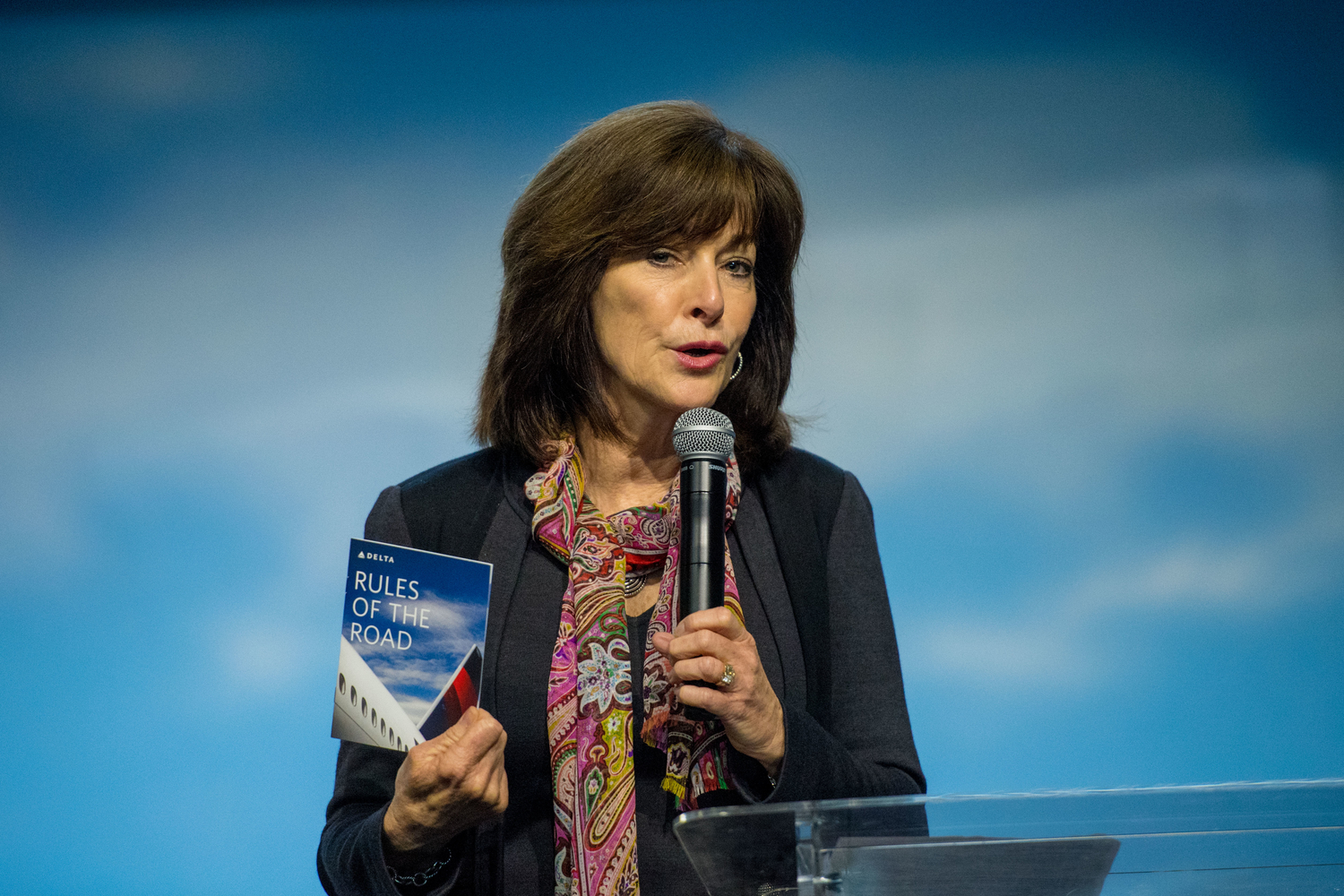
- Smith speaking at an event.
- Education: California Polytechnic State University (BBA)
- Occupation: Business Executive
- Years active: 2002 - present
- Employer: Delta Air Lines
- Title: Chief People Officer at Delta Air Lines
- Term: October 1, 2014 - present
- Predecessor: Mike Campbell
- Board member of: Atlanta Habitat for Humanity; Breast Cancer Research Foundation

Joanne Smith is an American business executive. She is the Executive Vice President and Chief People Officer at Delta Air Lines, serving in this role since October 1, 2014. Upon her appointment she replaced Mike Campbell.

== Education ==
Smith has a bachelor's degree in Business Administration from California Polytechnic State University.

== Career history ==
Smith joined Delta in 2002 as Vice President – Marketing and Customer Service at Song. Previously she served as Senior Vice President: In-Flight Service from March 2007 to September 2014. Before that she was Vice President: Marketing from November 2005 to February 2007.

She serves as a director or advisory board member of several organizations including Atlanta Habitat for Humanity, the Dean's Advisory Council for Orfalea College of Business and The Breast Cancer Research Foundation.

== Awards ==
Awards that Smith has received include: the 25 Power Women to Watch in Atlanta, Advertising Age: Top 10 Women to Watch, Wall Street Journal: Top Women to Watch, Honored Alumni of the Orfalea College of Business, and AWNY Changing the Game Award.
