= Larry D. Singell =

American economist

Larry D. Singell (Sr.) (born 1937) is an American economist and Emeritus Professor of Economics at the University of Colorado Boulder. He is known for work in applied economics, for example on the effects of green belts on residential property, and the National Maximum Speed Law.

== Biography ==
Born in Cleveland, Ohio, Singell earned his economics degree from Eastern Nazarene College in Quincy, Massachusetts, near Boston, in 1960. He continued his studies in economics at Wayne State University in Detroit, where he obtained his MA in 1962 and his Ph.D. in 1965.

Singell began his academic career at Wayne State University. In the 1970s he was appointed Professor of Economics at the University of Colorado, Boulder, where he served until retirement in 2002. Later he was awarded Emeritus Professor of Economics. He served as visiting professor at universities in Colorado, Nevada, Pennsylvania, Virginia, Melbourne, Australia and Glasgow, Scotland.

At the University of Colorado, Singell also served as head of the Economics Department in the 1970s, as Dean of the College of Business Administration, and as Faculty Ombudsman. Singell won several awards at the University of Colorado including the Distinguished Teaching Award from the Student Alumni Association, the Stanford Calderwood Teaching Excellence Award, the Robert L. Stearns Award, and the Distinguished Business Service Award, College of Business.

Singell's son, Larry D. Singell, Jr., followed his father's footsteps and is Professor of Economics at Indiana University, and since 2011 Executive Dean of its College of Arts and Sciences.

== Selected publications ==
- Kenneth E. Boulding & Fred R. Glahe, L. D. Singell (edi.), Collected Papers: International systems: peace, conflict resolution, and politics. Colorado Associated University Press, 1975.
- Kenneth E. Boulding (Author), Larry D. Singell (Editor). Collected Papers: Toward the Twenty-First Century : Political Economy, Social Systems, and World Peace. July, 1985.

Articles, a selection

- Correll, Mark R., Jane H. Lillydahl, and Larry D. Singell. "The effects of greenbelts on residential property values: some findings on the political economy of open space." Land economics 54.2 (1978): 207-217.
- Singell, Larry D., and Jane H. Lillydahl. "An empirical analysis of the commute to work patterns of males and females in two-earner households." Urban Studies 23.2 (1986): 119-129.
- Singell, Larry D.; McNown, Robert F. (October 1985). "A Cost-Benefit Analysis of the 55 MPH Speed Limit: Reply". Southern Economic Journal. 52 (2). Chapel Hill, NC: Southern Economic Association, University of North Carolina at Chapel Hill: 550–553. doi:10.2307/1059644. ISSN 0038-4038. JSTOR 1059644.
- LeRoy, Stephen F., and Larry D. Singell Jr. "Knight on risk and uncertainty." Journal of political economy 95.2 (1987): 394-406.
- Singell, Larry D., and Jane H. Lillydahl. "An empirical examination of the effect of impact fees on the housing market." Land Economics 66.1 (1990): 82-92.
- McDowell, John M., Larry D. Singell Jr, and James P. Ziliak. "Cracks in the glass ceiling: gender and promotion in the economics profession." American Economic Review (1999): 392-396.
- Singell, Larry D. "Come and stay a while: does financial aid effect retention conditioned on enrollment at a large public university?." Economics of Education review 23.5 (2004): 459-471.
