= Paul Orfalea =

American businessman (born 1947)

- Born: November 28, 1947 (age 78); Los Angeles, California, U.S.
- Known for: Founding Kinko's

Paul J. Orfalea (born November 28, 1947) is an American businessman who founded the copy-chain Kinko's.

Orfalea was born in Los Angeles, California to Lebanese parents. He is currently a philanthropist and a visiting professor at California Lutheran University's School of Management, in the Global and International Studies Department of the University of California at Santa Barbara (UCSB), at the Lloyd Greif Center for Entrepreneurial Studies at the University of Southern California (USC) Marshall School of Business, and at the Fred Kiesner Center for Entrepreneurship for the College of Business Administration at Loyola Marymount University. He is married to Jane Walker Wood the ex-wife of Christopher Lloyd.

== Early life ==
Orfalea's father and grandmother ran clothing stores in Los Angeles. According to Orfalea, he was a woodshop major in high school, and his typical report card was "two C's, three D's, and an F." Due to his dyslexia and attention deficit hyperactivity disorder, Orfalea reportedly flunked two grades and was expelled from several schools. He later attended the University of Southern California. Despite being fired from a number of jobs, his family supported him in his determination to launch his own business. In later life, he remarked on the subject of his handicaps, "I get bored easily, and that is a great motivator, I think everybody should have dyslexia and ADD." His curly, red hair earned him the nickname "Kinko".

== Kinko's ==
Orfalea started his own business while attending UC Santa Barbara. With a $5,000 bank loan co-signed by his parents, Orfalea founded Kinko's in 1970. His first store, which he rented for $100 a month was a small single office space adjacent to a hamburger stand in the Isla Vista neighborhood where the majority of students from UC Santa Barbara resided. Orfalea began selling notebooks, pens, pencils, and the services of a copying machine at 4 cents per copy.

Within ten years, Kinko's grew to a network of over 80 stores across the country. Rather than franchise, Orfalea formed partnerships with each individual store's local co-owners. Since the stores were located mostly near college campuses and staffed by part-time students, the business was initially driven by the needs of university students. The clientele soon expanded to include other high-end document users, such as job seekers printing resumes and business users generating professional documentation. Orfalea's open-for-24-hours policy increased the store's popularity and led to the spread of Kinko's across the United States and internationally, and ultimately to more than 1,200 locations and 23,000 employees in 10 different countries.

Orfalea put a high value on employee satisfaction; he was known to thank his employees by having elaborate company parties where all were welcome. Kinko parties were well known by Santa Barbarans, and were held in various historic parks & recreation venues throughout Santa Barbara, Goleta and Isla Vista. e.g., Childs Estate, now known as The Santa Barbara Zoo. He had many friends that were small business owners around town that he inspired with his hi-octane "get it done" attitude. Fortune Magazine named Kinko's one of the best places in America to work for three years in a row. Kinko's was acquired by FedEx in 2004 and was renamed FedEx Kinkos, currently doing business as FedEx Office. Having sold Kinko's, Paul Orfalea is still involved in other ventures in real estate, private equity and venture capital. He was interviewed in 2005 following the publication of Copy This, a memoir describing the birth and rise of Kinko's.

== Philanthropy ==
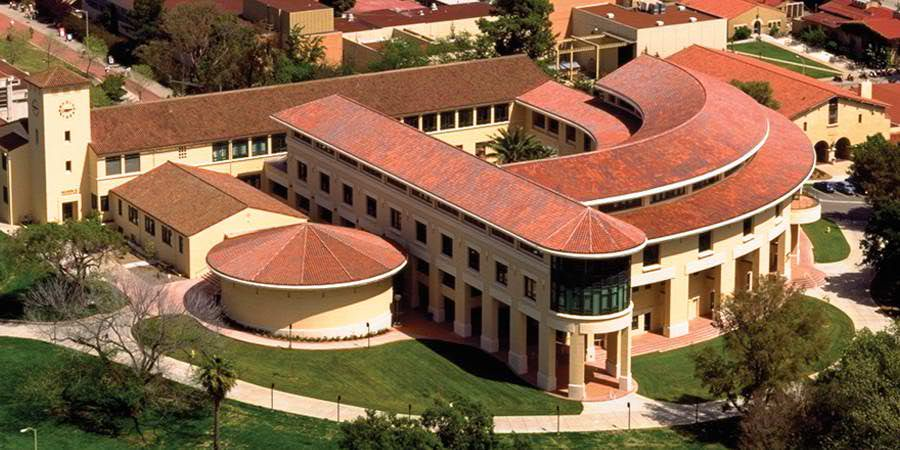
The Orfalea College of Business at the California Polytechnic State University

In 2000, Orfalea established the Orfalea Family Foundation that deals with differences in learning, care in early life stages, knowledge-giving programs that span the needs of multiple generations, and training for caregiving. The Orfalea Foundation, as it is now known, focuses on early childhood education, K-college education, and youth development, primarily in Santa Barbara County, California. The foundation is known for taking direct action as well as making grants. Its most visible program, the School Food Initiative (SFI), trains food service staff and directors to transition from heat-and-serve fare to cooked-from-scratch meals in local schools. SFI also provides infrastructure and equipment grants to support scratch cooking, along with farm-to-school connections, school gardens, and food literacy programs.

In 2001, the California Polytechnic State University's College of Business was renamed the Orfalea College of Business, in recognition of his $15 million gift to the school.

== Publications ==
- Copy This!: Lessons from a Hyperactive Dyslexic Who Turned a Bright Idea into One of America's Best Companies. 2005, Paul Orfalea; Ann Marsh. Workman Publishing
- Two Billion Dollars in Nickels: Reflections on the Entrepreneurial Life. 2008, Paul Orfalea; Dean Zatkowsky. Dizzy One Ventures LLC
- The Entrepreneurial Investor: The Art, Science, and Business of Value Investing. 2008, Paul Orfalea; Lance Helfert; Atticus Lowe; Dean Zatkowsky. John Wiley & Sons
