= Kenneth Merchant =

Kenneth Merchant holds the Deloitte and Touche LLP Chair of Accountancy at the Leventhal School of Accounting, part of the Marshall School of Business at the University of Southern California. He is the former dean of the Leventhal School.

== Career ==
Dr. Merchant is the author of many articles and books on accounting, including the standard textbooks:

- Accounting: Text and Cases, 14th ed. (with Robert N. Anthony, and David F. Hawkins). Chicago: Irwin/McGraw-Hill (2012). ISBN 0-07-281950-2
- Management Control Systems: Performance Measurement, Evaluation and Incentives, 4th ed.(with Wim A. Van der Stede). Pearson/Prentice Hall, London (2017) ISBN 0-273-70801-5
- Management Accounting, An Integrative Approach, 2nd ed. (with C.J. McNair-Connolly). Institute of Management Accountants (2018).

In the second book Merchant describes three forms of control: control of specific actions, control of results and control of personnel. When knowledge of which specific actions are desirable is excellent, it is always a good thing to control specific actions. When the ability to measure results on important performance dimensions is high, it is always a good thing to control results. When it is difficult to know which specific actions are desirable and when it is difficult as well to measure the results, the optimal control is the personnel control.

Dr. Merchant previously taught at Harvard Business School, currently serves on thirteen editorial boards, and has served on 10 boards of various types (public and private companies, mutual fund, non-profit organizations).

== Education ==
His Ph.D. is from the University of California at Berkeley. His M.B.A. is from Columbia Business School. His B.S. is from Union College.
