= Les Hoffman =

Radio and television entertainment executive (1906–1971)

H. Leslie Hoffman
- Born: Herman Leslie Hoffman; 1906
- Died: June 24, 1971; Zurich, Switzerland (residence: San Marino, California, US)
- Other name: Les Hoffman
- Occupations: Founder and CEO of Hoffman Radio, later called Hoffman Electronics Corporation 1941–1971
- Known for: Pioneering work on practical photovoltaic cells, aircraft navigation systems, radio and television products, philanthropy, and major donor and supporter of the University of Southern California (USC).

H. Leslie Hoffman (1906 – June 24, 1971) was an American businessman. He was the founder and CEO of Hoffman Radio from 1941 to 1971, which changed its name to Hoffman Radio and Television in 1948. In the 1950s, he formed Hoffman Electronics Corporation, based in El Monte, California, consisting of several electronic divisions involved with consumer, industrial and military products. He was married to Elaine Stevely Hoffman (1906–1989). Together in 1954, they formed the H. Leslie Hoffman and Elaine S. Hoffman Foundation, Pasadena, a philanthropic organization. He and his wife Elaine were large donors and supporters of the University of Southern California (USC) and were directly involved with its growth, academic growth and stature. Hoffman served on the Board of Trustees at USC for 17 years.

== Period before Hoffman Radio ==
Between 1929 and 1931, a company called Mission Bell Radio Manufacturing Company was formed. They were based in Los Angeles and specialized in low-cost midget radio receivers. To keep cost down Mission Bell would buy as many prefabricated parts as possible and made a few design changes to established radio chassis to avoid legal action. It was a company that was always in financial problems throughout the 1930s. By 1941 the company filed for bankruptcy.

In 1941, Les Hoffman, then a fluorescent lamp salesman, came to the Mission Bell Radio Office to collect an overdue debt. The doors were locked and they were closed for good. Finding out the company went bankrupt, he decided to buy Mission Bell Radio and continue to make radios under the name Hoffman Radio. The company would remain in Los Angeles.

== Hoffman Radio and Television ==
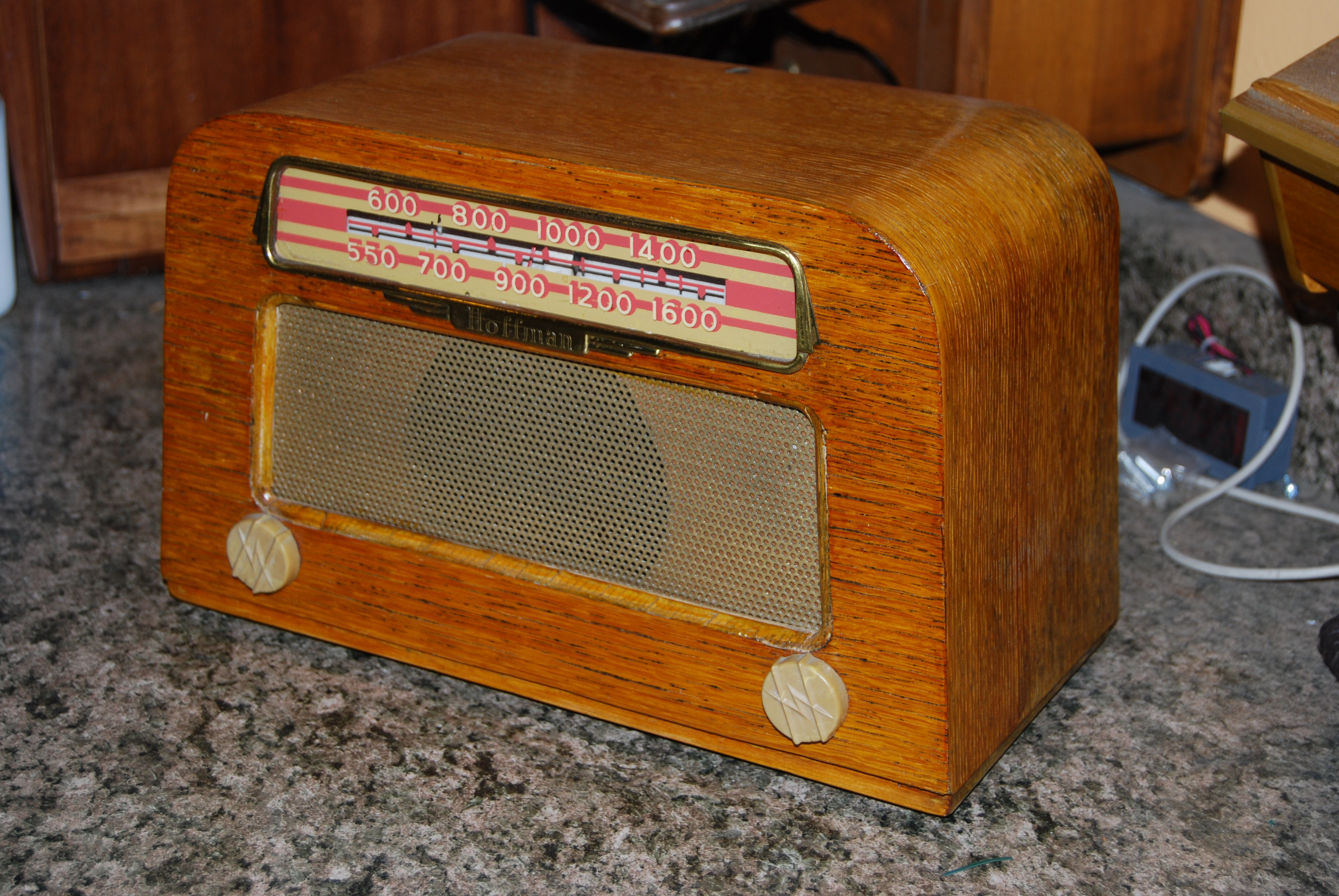
One of Hoffman Radio's first products, the Model A203, sold from 1946 to 1947. One of the last Mission Bell Radio products, it was first sold as a Mission Bell brand then rebranded as a Hoffman Radio.

For a short while Hoffman would continue the Mission Bell Radio name and designs. By 1947, Hoffman started designing their own models. About 1948–1949, Hoffman began manufacturing television receivers, since RCA made their television patents royalty-free. He aggressively marketed his product regionally, trying to maintain a good regional reputation and recognizable brand name. By 1950 Time magazine writes about Les Hoffman's achievements in making Hoffman Radio and Television the largest west coast producer of televisions. In two years (1948–1950) Hoffman Radio and Television sales went from $3.5 million to almost $12 million.

One of the reason for Les Hoffman's success was in the quality of his products. Hoffman radios and televisions were built well, using proven engineering practices and sometimes applying practices used in military electronics. Hoffman moved into color television slowly and by the late 1960s had a full line of consumer products. Hoffman would continue making televisions until 1977.

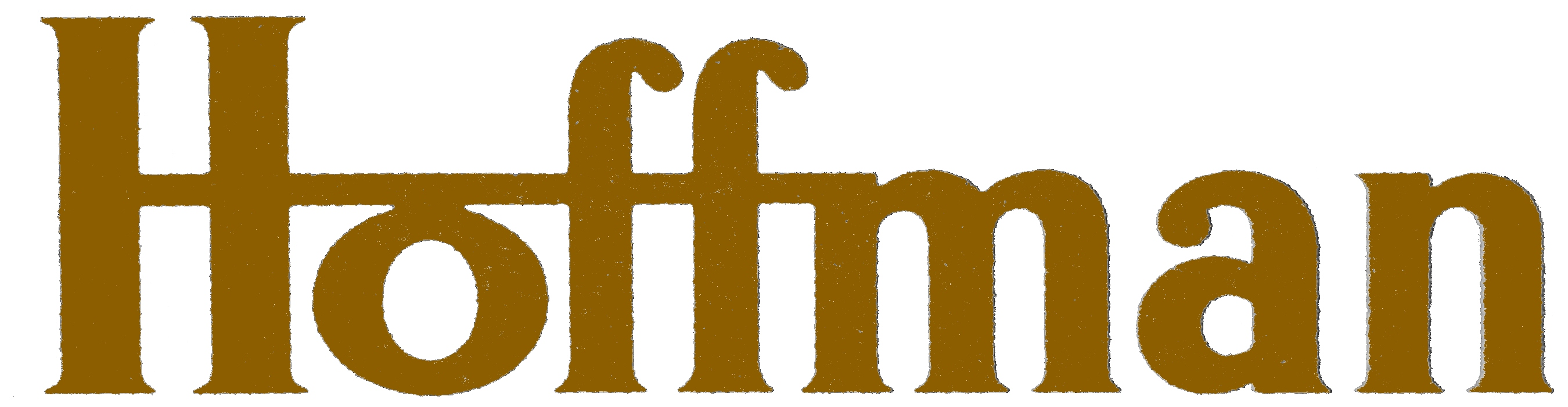
Original company logo Hoffman used on its products

=== Hoffman Easy Vision television ===
When Les Hoffman entered the television manufacturing business, he was a newcomer. He needed to keep his costs down and did not have the resources like the established companies such as Zenith or Philco. After World War II ended, there was considerable surplus materials that needed to be cleared out of company and government stores. Television picture tubes require a protective safety glass in front of it to prevent injury if the picture tube imploded. Hoffman found large quantities of yellow Plexiglas used in aircraft. Since it was low price he bought large quantities. However, the television viewing area had a yellow-green tint to it. During the early years of television there was considerable concerns that long term viewing television could damage one's eyesight due to eye strain. Hoffman took advantage of this scare by advertising that the yellow-green tinted screen reduced eye strain. He marketed his televisions as "Easy Vision". Les Hoffman definitely was a shrewd and market-savvy businessman.

== Hoffman Electronics Corporation ==
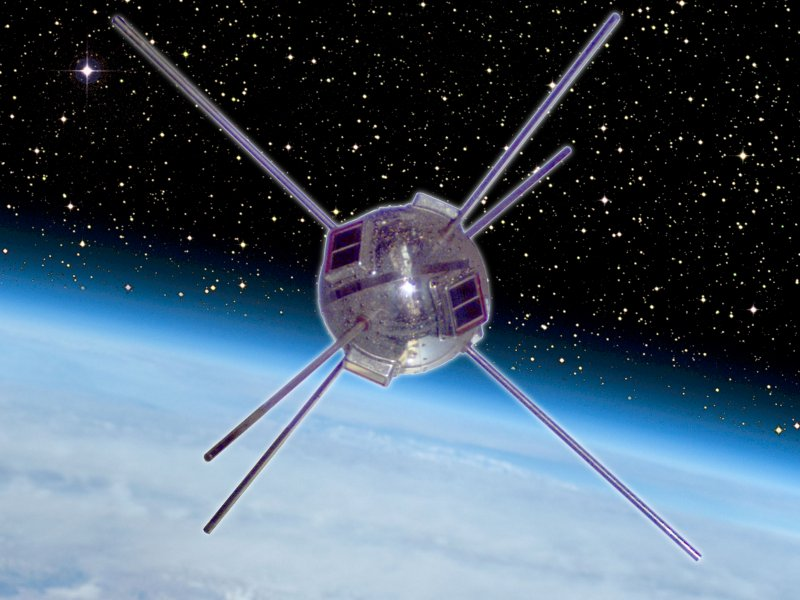
Vanguard 1, launched in 1958, was the first major application of the use of photovoltaic (solar) cells as a source of energy. The panels or arrays consisted of solar cells made by Hoffman Electronics, Semiconductor Division.

From 1950 to 1960 Hoffman became diversified, through startups and acquisitions of consumer, industrial and military electronics firms. The company reorganized into Hoffman Electronics Corporation, based in El Monte, California, about 15 miles (24 km) east of Los Angeles. Several divisions were formed, of which the most prominent were:

- Consumer products (Hoffman Radio and Television)
- Semiconductor products
- Military products

Since the early days of World War II Hoffman produced for the military various items, such as radar, communications, countermeasures, navigation and ASW equipment.

=== Solar cells ===
The invention of the transistor in 1948 must have had an effect on Leslie Hoffman. In the early 1950s, he took a major interest in solar cells, also called photovoltaic cells. When Bell Labs introduced the solar cell to the world in 1951 it was only a curiosity. It had a very poor light-to-electricity conversion efficiency of 2 percent, and was very fragile and expensive to fabricate. Several manufacturers, including Hoffman, managed to improve the efficiency to 4.5 percent by 1954, but photovoltaic cells were still impractical.

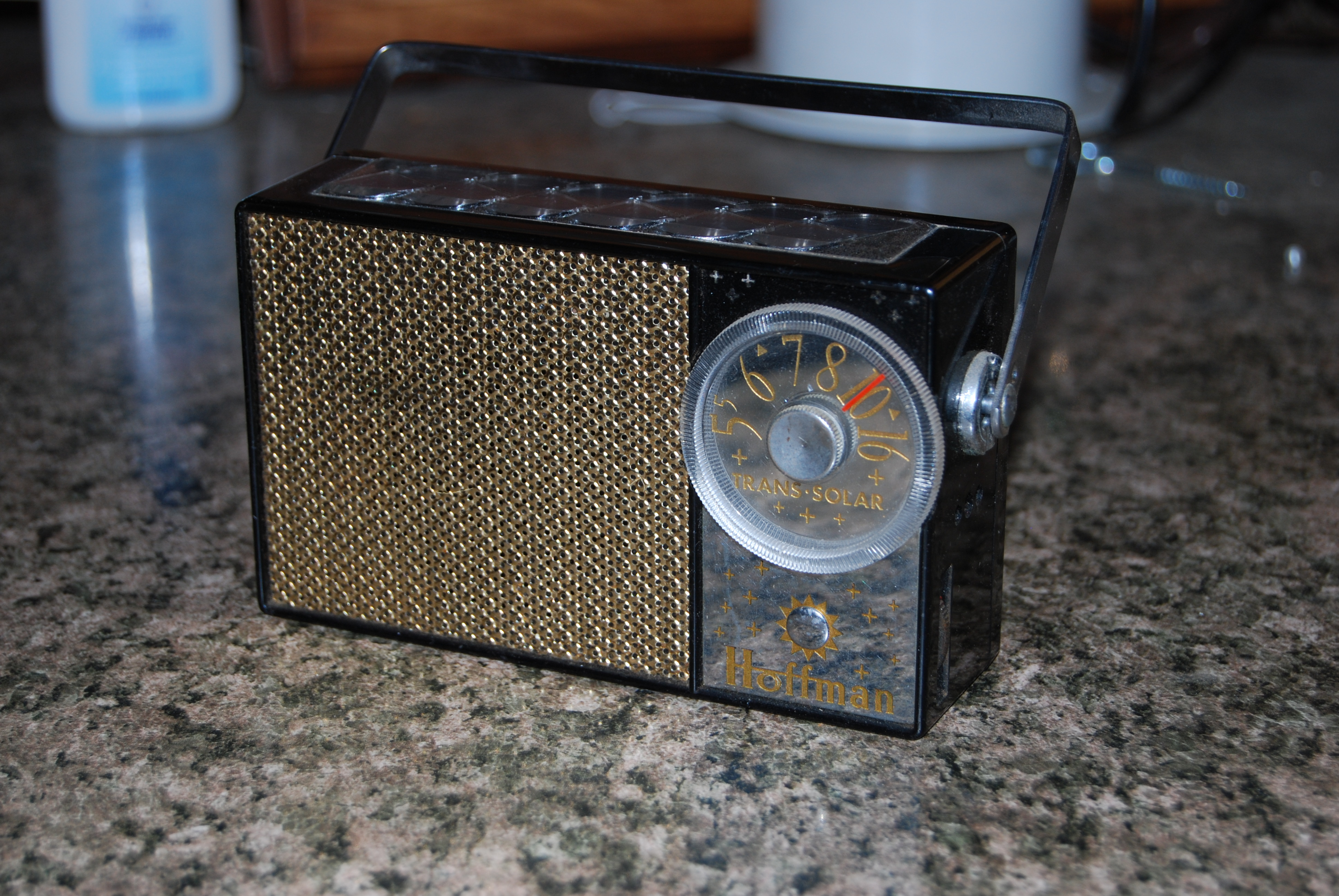
Hoffman KP706 Trans Solar Radio (1959), running on batteries or with a Hoffman solar cell array on the top.

Hoffman made great strides in making the solar cell a practical and useful source of renewable energy. From 1957 to 1960, he improved its efficiency from 4.5 to 14 percent and lowered the production cost to make it a marketable item. One of Hoffman's great achievements was the first satellite to be powered by solar cells, the Vanguard 1, launched in 1958. The solar arrays or panels are Hoffman photovoltaic cells. In 1959 H. Leslie Hoffman received the David Packard Medal of Achievement for innovation. In 1959 he was one of the board of directors for the Electronic Industries Association (EIA).

The success of Vanguard 1 led Hoffman to broaden the use of his solar cells into other products and applications. In 1959, the launch of the U.S. satellite Explorer 6 had solar arrays using 9,600 Hoffman solar cells. Hoffman's Consumer Products Division introduced a transistor radio line that operated with solar cells or batteries. The four models they produced were the P-411 Solaradio (1956), the P-706 Trans Solar radio (1959), the P-709X (1961), and the 719 (1965).

=== Air navigation systems ===
Hoffman Electronics Military Division specialized in air navigation, communications and radar systems. Most of the work and design was done in El Monte, California. In 1957 Hoffman Electronics became a leader in designing airborne navigation systems, called Tactical Air Navigation (TACAN). It is a series of ground- or ship-based transmitter and receiver stations that can provide bearing, slant distance and other related information to any aircraft sending the correct frequency and code. It became a standard navigation system used in U.S. military aircraft, including the U.S. Space Shuttle program. Parts of TACAN can be used for civil aircraft to providing bearing, distance and landing approaches. The development of the Global Positioning System (GPS) will eventually displace TACAN.

In the 1960s the Military Products Division continued to grow. They advertised in newspapers, magazines and nearby universities, recruiting engineering students to consider Hoffman as an engineering career. The El Monte site was located near major engineering universities in the Los Angeles County area. Within 20 miles (32 km) circle there was California Institute of Technology (Caltech); University of California, Los Angeles (UCLA); University of Southern California (USC); California State University, Long Beach (Long Beach State); California State Polytechnic University, Pomona (Cal Poly); and Loyola University.

=== Relationship with science fiction writer Isaac Asimov ===
The February 1962 edition of Scientific American published a short story by acclaimed American science fiction writer Isaac Asimov. The title of the work was "My Son, the Physicist". The work was commissioned by Hoffman Electronics. The story later became part of a collection of Asimov short stories called Nightfall and Other Stories in 1969.

=== After 1977 ===
Six years after Les Hoffman's death in 1971, the board of directors decided to sell the corporation. Gould Electronics purchased most of the divisions in 1978. Gould Electronics was mainly interested in the Military Products Division, which it retained. All other groups were closed or sold. In 1988 the Military Products Division became an independent company called NavCom Defense Electronics Inc. with its home office in El Monte (later moved to Corona). Their Web site still links their roots in Hoffman Electronics.

Hoffman Video Systems was the only segment of Hoffman Electronics Corporation that remained with the Les Hoffman legacy. Les Hoffman's son-in-law, J. Kristoffer Popovich, formed Hoffman Video Systems with Robert Jablonski in 1978. Their goal was to supply video products and consultation for industrial and commercial applications. Their home base was in Glendale, but had operations throughout the US. The company remains in business as of 2012. The business was purchased by Anderson Video.

== Philanthropic work ==
In September 1954, the H. Leslie Hoffman and Elaine S. Hoffman Foundation was formed. Its purpose was to advance education and education activities. The largest benefactor was the University of Southern California. Their donations and matching contributions totaled over $2.5 million over the years and help shape the future of USC. Major areas of support are in business and medicine. Two buildings are named after them. At the USC Marshall School of Business there is the H. Leslie Hoffman Hall. The Elaine S. Hoffman Medical Research Center is at the school of medicine.

After the death of her parents, Jane Hoffman Popovich and her husband, J. Kristoffer Popovich, continue the tradition and remain actively involve in the academic growth and stature of USC. Both are USC graduates (Jane Hoffman, BS 1965 and J. Popovich, BS 1965 and MBA 1970). The Jane Hoffman Popovich and J. Kristoffer Popovich Hall at the USC Marshall School of Business is named in their honor.

== Family notes ==
After Les Hoffman died, his wife Elaine continued their involvement of the foundation until her death on August 5, 1989. She was an active donor and supporter of the Los Angeles County Museum of Art (LACMA) and the Pasadena Art Museum. Les and Elaine Hoffman had one daughter, Jane Hoffman, who married J. Kristoffer Popovich. As stated earlier, Popovich would run Hoffman Video Systems as a separate company after the Gould Electronics purchase of Hoffman Electronics in 1977.

Two buildings at the University of Southern California bear the Hoffman name. At the USC Marshall School of Business there is the H. Leslie Hoffman Hall. At the school of medicine there is the Elaine S. Hoffman Medical Research Center.

Les Hoffman, a resident of San Marino, California, died abroad in 1971, in Zürich, Switzerland; Elaine S. Hoffman died August 1985 in San Marino. Both are interred at Rose Hills Memorial Park in Whittier, California.
