= Geoffrey Garrett =

Australian political scientist

- Education: Australian National University; Duke University
- Occupations: Political scientist, academic administrator
- Employer: University of Southern California
- Title: Special Advisor to the USC President for Global Strategy and Engagement

Geoffrey Garrett is an Australian political scientist, academic administrator, and the former dean of the University of Southern California Marshall School of Business. He has served as a professor of political science at the University of Oxford, Stanford University, Yale University, the University of California, Los Angeles (UCLA), the University of Southern California (USC) and the University of Sydney. He was also the dean of the University of Sydney Business School and the University of New South Wales Business School (UNSW Business School). He was the dean of the Wharton School of the University of Pennsylvania from July 2014 until June 2020.

On 1 July 2020 Garrett became the 18th dean of the USC Marshall School of Business. He was succeeded by Andrew Call on August 1st, 2026.

== Early life ==
Geoffrey Garrett was born in Australia, and he graduated from the Australian National University. He was a Fulbright Scholar at Duke University, where he earned a master's degree and a PhD in 1990.

== Career ==
Garrett was a fellow in politics at University College, Oxford, from 1986 to 1988. He joined the Department of Political Science at Stanford University as an assistant professor in 1988, and rose to tenured full professor in 1997. He was a professor of Political Science at Yale University from 1999 to 2001, and a professor of Political Science at the University of California, Los Angeles (UCLA) from 2001 to 2005. He was also the dean of the UCLA International Institute and vice provost of international studies. He was professor of international relations, business administration, communication and law at the University of Southern California from 2005 to 2008, and the president of the Pacific Council on International Policy from 2005 to 2009.

Garrett returned to Australia in 2009, where he was a professor of political science at the University of Sydney and the founding CEO of its United States Studies Centre from 2008 to 2012. He was the dean of the University of Sydney Business School from 2012 to 2013, and the dean of the Australian School of Business, now known as the UNSW Business School, from 2013 to 2014. Garrett succeeded Thomas S. Robertson as the dean of the Wharton School of the University of Pennsylvania on 1 July 2014. He was also the Reliance Professor of Management and Private Enterprise in the Management Department at Wharton and Professor of Political Science.

He serves on the advisory board of Global Policy.

Garrett rejoined the University of Southern California as the Marshall School Dean, Robert R. Dockson Dean’s Chair in Business Administration, and Professor of Management and Organization on 1 July 2020

Garrett serves on the boards of advisors of the Indian School of Business and the Tsinghua University School of Economics and Management. He is also a fellow of the Academy of the Social Sciences in Australia.

== Controversy ==
In 2020, after several of USC Professor Greg Patton's students complained to the university about the professor using a common Mandarin filler word in a lecture that equated to the English word "that", which the students mistook for a racial pejorative, Geoffrey Garrett advised students that the professor would no longer be teaching the course. "It is simply unacceptable for the faculty to use words in class that can marginalize, hurt and harm the psychological safety of our students", he said. Other USC students backed Patton's academic use of the word, with many on social media noting that the punishment appeared to be discrimination against speakers of Chinese.

In April 2026, 52 tenured Marshall faculty members signed a letter warning that the school was on a "downward trajectory". On June 10, USC announced that Garrett would step down as dean effective August 1 and become Special Advisor to the President for Global Strategy and Engagement. The announcement came weeks before a faculty no-confidence vote scheduled for July 1. Andrew Call, dean of the Leventhal School of Accounting, was named interim dean.

== Works ==
- Garrett, Geoffrey (1998). Partisan Politics in the Global Economy. New York: Cambridge University Press. ISBN 9780521446907.
- Dobbin, Frank; Garrett, Geoffrey; Simmons, Beth, eds. (2008). The Global Diffusion of Democracy and Markets. New York: Cambridge University Press.
- Alt, James; Chambers, Simone; Garrett, Geoffrey; Levi, Margaret; McClain, Paula, eds. (2010). The Encyclopedia of Political Science. Washington, D.C.: Congressional Quarterly Press.
