= Richard B. Chase =

American operations manager

Richard B. Chase is Professor Emeritus of Operations Management Marshall School of Business, University of Southern California Ph.D., MBA, B.S., UCLA.

Chase specializes in service operations management, which involves applying concepts from OM, organizational theory, and services marketing to the design of service processes. He devised the customer contact theory for service organization.

== Academic work ==
Chase is known for the Production & Operations Management series book on Operations and Supply Chain with the 13th edition being co-authored with R. Jacobs. With versions in seven different languages, it is one of the world's most widely used texts on the topic.

Chase's two most cited articles, "Where Does the Customer Fit in a Service Operation?" and "The Service Factory". have appeared in the Harvard Business Review.

Chase has served on the faculties of the Harvard Business School, University of Arizona, UCLA, IMD in Switzerland Decision Sciences Institute, and POMS.

in 2013, Chase, with co-author Sriram Dasu, published The Customer Service Solution: Managing Emotions, Trust, and Control to Win Your Customer’s Business.

== Honors ==
- 2004: Scholar of the Year by the POM Division of the Academy of Management.
- 2007: lifetime achievement award from the Production and Operations Management Society
- 2009: Honored as a major contributor to the field of service operations management in the January issue of the POMS Journal and also was awarded the Lovelock Award for his contribution to services by the American Marketing Association.
- 2010: Selected by the UCLA Anderson School of Management for their 100 Points of Impact honors.

== Published books ==
- The Customer Service Solution: Managing Emotions, Trust, and Control to Win Your Customer’s Business, (with S. Dasu) McGraw Hill 2013
- Operations Management for Competitive Advantage (with N. Aquilano and R. Jacobs), McGraw-Hill/Irwin, Inc., 1973, 1977, 1981, 1985, 1989, 1992, 1995, 1998, 2000. (Among the three most widely adopted texts in Operations Management since 1974.) Reprinted in Spanish, Portuguese, Chinese, Simplified Chinese, and Russian.
- Mistakeproofing--Designing the Errors Out of the System (with D. Stewart), Productivity Press, 1995. (Reprinted in Icelandic.)
- Fundamentals of Operations Management (with N. Aquilano and M. Davis), McGraw-Hill/Irwin, Inc., 1991, 1994, 1998, 2000.
- Service Management Effectiveness (with D. Bowen and T. Cummings), Jossey-Bass, 1990.
- Management: A Life Cycle Approach (with D. Tansik and N. Aquilano), Richard D. Irwin, Inc., 1981.
