= Kirk Snyder (author) =

American author

- Education: University of Southern California; Pepperdine University
- Occupations: Academic, author

Kirk Snyder is an American academic and author. He is a Professor of Business Communication at the USC Marshall School of Business in Los Angeles, California. He has authored three books including Finding Work You Love: 3 Steps to Getting The Perfect Job After College (Ten Speed Press/Penguin Random House, 2020), in addition to two critically acclaimed books on LGBT employees and executives.

== Early life ==
Kirk Snyder graduated from the University of Southern California, where he received a bachelor of science in business administration. He received a master of arts degree in communication from Pepperdine University. He received a doctorate degree in education from the University of Southern California.

== Career ==
Snyder is a Professor of Clinical Business Communication at the USC Marshall School of Business. He is the author of three books on the subject of career development and leadership success. His work has been widely featured in the media and as a keynote corporate speaker, he has been featured at numerous Fortune 500 companies.

According to The Guardian, he has argued that, "the best managers are gay - because they understand diversity and value individuality, they can bring a team together." Moreover, his research shows that under openly gay managers, employees feel more engaged and they are more productive. Additionally, he has shown that few LGBT executives come out of the closet due to shareholder pressure. He adds that many gay executives eschew corporate discrimination by embracing entrepreneurship, thus becoming their own bosses.

== Bibliography ==
- Lavender Road To Success: The Career Guide for the Gay Community (Ten Speed Press, 2003). ISBN 978-1580084963
- The G Quotient: Why Gay Executives are Excelling as Leaders... And What Every Manager Needs to Know (Jossey-Bass, 2006). ISBN 978-0787982461
- Finding Work You Love: 3 Steps to Getting The Perfect Job After College (Penguin Random House, 2020). ISBN 978-1984856678
