= William Frederic Boulding =

American economist, professor, and academic administrator

William Boulding
- Born: 1955 (age 70–71); Ann Arbor, Michigan, U.S.
- Education: Swarthmore College; Wharton School of the University of Pennsylvania
- Known for: Dynamic process model of service quality (1993)
- Scientific career
- Fields: Marketing management and consumer relations
- Workplaces: Duke University

William Frederic (Bill) Boulding (born 1955) is an American economist, professor and academic administrator. He is a former dean of the Fuqua School of Business at Duke University.

== Biography ==
=== Early life ===
Boulding was born 1955 in Ann Arbor as the fifth Child son of Kenneth E. Boulding, an English-born economist, and Elise M. Boulding, a Norwegian-born sociologist.

Boulding graduated from Swarthmore College, where he earned a bachelor's degree in economics in 1977. He enrolled in the MBA program at the Wharton School of the University of Pennsylvania and switched to the doctorate program after Professor Thomas S. Robertson encouraged him to do so. He earned a PhD in Managerial Sciences and Applied Economics in 1986.

=== Career ===
Boulding joined the faculty at the Fuqua School of Business at Duke University in 1984, where he taught marketing. One of his students was Tim Cook, who later became the CEO of Apple Inc. He succeeded Blair Sheppard as its dean in summer 2011. By February 2013, he was fundraising towards a $100 million campaign and expanding the school's global reach in Brazil, South Africa, India, the Middle East and China. In July 2016, he suggested business school professors should play a bigger role in civil society to reduce their perception of elitism.

Boulding has published research on management and consumer relations as well as the healthcare industry. He has been published in many journals like the Harvard Business Review, the Journal of Marketing, Marketing Science, the Journal of Marketing Research, the Journal of Consumer Research, the American Heart Journal, Medical Care, the Annals of Emergency Medicine, The American Journal of Managed Care, and The New England Journal of Medicine.

Boulding served on the board of directors of the Graduate Management Admission Council, which owns the Graduate Management Admission Test (GMAT). He also serves on the board of managers of his alma mater, Swarthmore College.

Boulding was opposed to the Public Facilities Privacy & Security Act.

== Selected publications ==
Articles, a selection

- Boulding, William, et al. "A dynamic process model of service quality: from expectations to behavioral intentions." Journal of marketing research 30.1 (1993): 7.
- Boulding, William, and Amna Kirmani. "A consumer-side experimental examination of signaling theory: do consumers perceive warranties as signals of quality?." Journal of Consumer Research 20.1 (1993): 111–123.
- Boulding, William, et al. "A customer relationship management roadmap: What is known, potential pitfalls, and where to go." Journal of marketing 69.4 (2005): 155–166.
- Manary, M. P., Boulding, W., Staelin, R., & Glickman, S. W. (2013). "The patient experience and health outcomes." New England Journal of Medicine, 368(3), 201–203.
