= Armen Margarian =

American entrepreneur

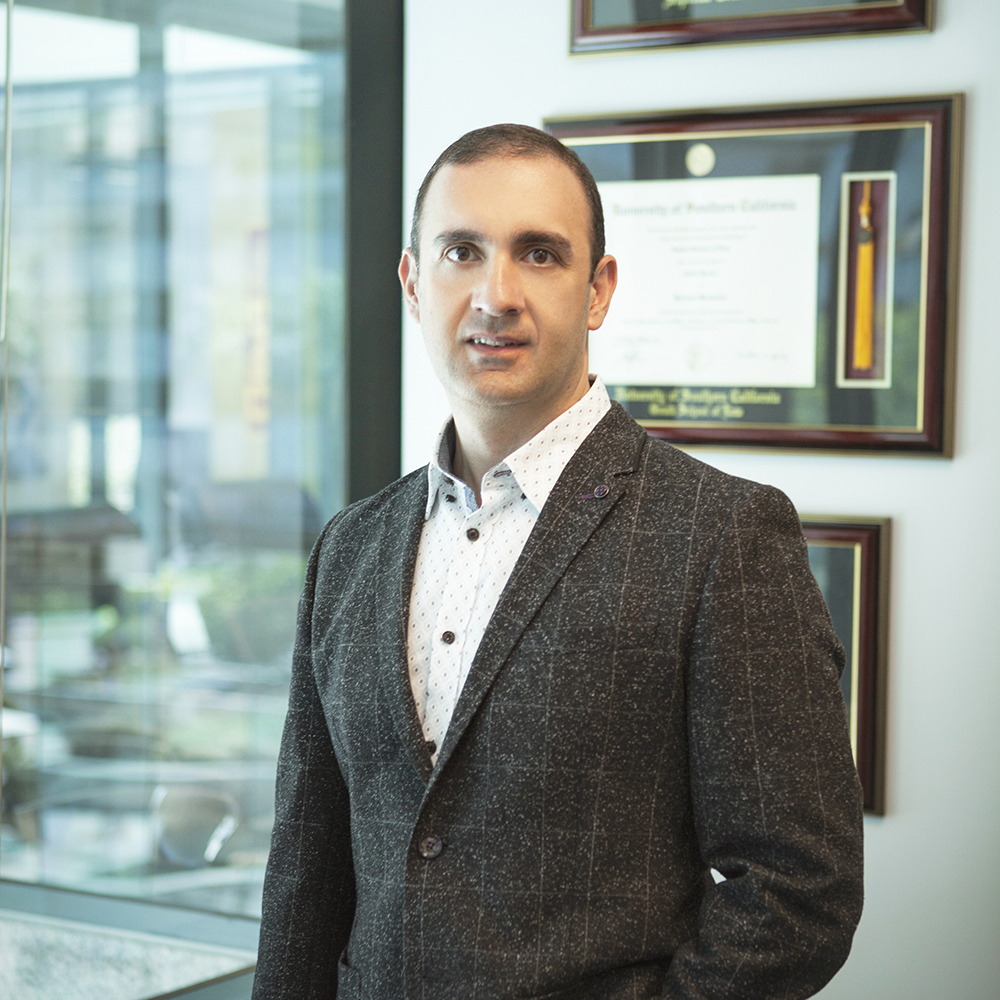
- Born: September 8, 1978 (age 47); Yerevan, Armenia
- Education: University of Southern California; USC Marshall School of Business
- Occupations: CEO, Strategist, Litigator
- Spouse: Diana Margarian (m. 2024)

Armen Margarian (Armenian Արմեն Մարգարյան) is an American entrepreneur, strategist and the CEO/co-founder/CEO of, Inc. a Berkeley Skydeck accelerator company which provides litigation support to attorneys and law firms. Formerly the CEO of NexusLab Inc. which was recognized as one of fastest growing private companies in the US in 2009 by the Inc.5000 Magazine.

== Early life and education ==
Armen Margarian was born in Yerevan, Armenia. His family moved to the US when he was a teenager. Margarian graduated from the University of Southern California with a BS degree in Molecular Biology in 2001.

In 1998, Armen became a McNair Scholar and conducted extensive research in the field of Neurobiology at the USC School of Pharmacy. His research was presented at the 5th International McNair Conference.

From 2000 to 2002, Margarian conducted research at the UCLA department of Cardiology and Cardiothoracic surgery. He co-authored a research article in the peer-reviewed journal Transplantation on “Cause of Atrioventricular Block in Patients After Heart Transplantation.”. Armen continued his education at the USC Marshall School of Business and received his MBA in 2006. During his years in graduate school he was the president of the Armenian Graduate Student Association and lead numerous fundraising projects to rebuild schools and hospital around the world.

Margarian frequently lectures at the University of Southern California, American University of Armenia and The Tumo Center for Creative Technologies.

== Career ==
In May 2002, Margarian and his brother, Hovanes Margarian, co-founded AutoIntel – an automotive enterprise for individual vehicle brokerage and corporate fleet management.

From 2006, Margarian started and lead numerous ventures in the United States and Eastern Europe under the NexusLab brand. Some of these ventures were: Eventish.com, LawyerOnIt, ArmeniaOne and LeaseSmart Calculator. The company developed technology that helped organizations and individuals to benefit from various comprehensive solutions.

Margarian is the Publisher of the Consumer Law Magazine, Startup Law Magazine and Wise Car Shopper magazine.

Currently, Margarian is a manager at The Margarian Law Firm.

== Public services and philanthropy ==
Margarian is active in community based and international non-profit organizations. He was a board member of the Armenian American Chamber of Commerce, International Bone Marrow Donor Registry, President of the USC Armenian Graduate Students Association. He is currently the president, co-founder, of the USC Armenian Alumni Association.

Since 2013 Hovanes Margarian and Armen Margarian announced the Margarian Scholarship program. The scholarship distributes $5,000 to $10,000 annually to exceptional students around the world based on their academic performance and commitment to their heritage, community, and the society at large. ,

== Awards and honors ==
1998 USC McNair Scholar.
