= My Son, the Physicist =

1962 short story by Isaac Asimov

"My Son, the Physicist" is a science fiction short story by American writer Isaac Asimov. It was commissioned by Hoffman Electronics Corporation and appeared in February 1962 in Scientific American. It later appeared in Asimov's collection Nightfall and Other Stories (1969).

== Plot summary ==
Gerard Cremona, a communications engineer with an American space agency, is trying to maintain communication that has been established with an expedition that has apparently reached Pluto after four years in space. The difficulty lies in the significant delays for the radio signal to travel back and forth, making timely and meaningful interaction impossible.

His proud mother, who happens to visit his office whilst he is wrestling with the problem, ultimately advises him to keep talking and get the expedition crew to keep talking as well. That way, although it normally takes twelve hours for radio waves to cover the distance, it is possible to have effectively continuous conversation.

Mrs. Cremona declares that all women know that the secret to spreading news is to "Just Keep Talking". Thus, by constantly transmitting data and instructions from both ends, and interjecting questions or responses as needed, no time need be wasted.

Although it plays no part in the story, the fictional supercomputer Multivac is mentioned inter alia.
