= Steve McIntosh =

American author and businessman

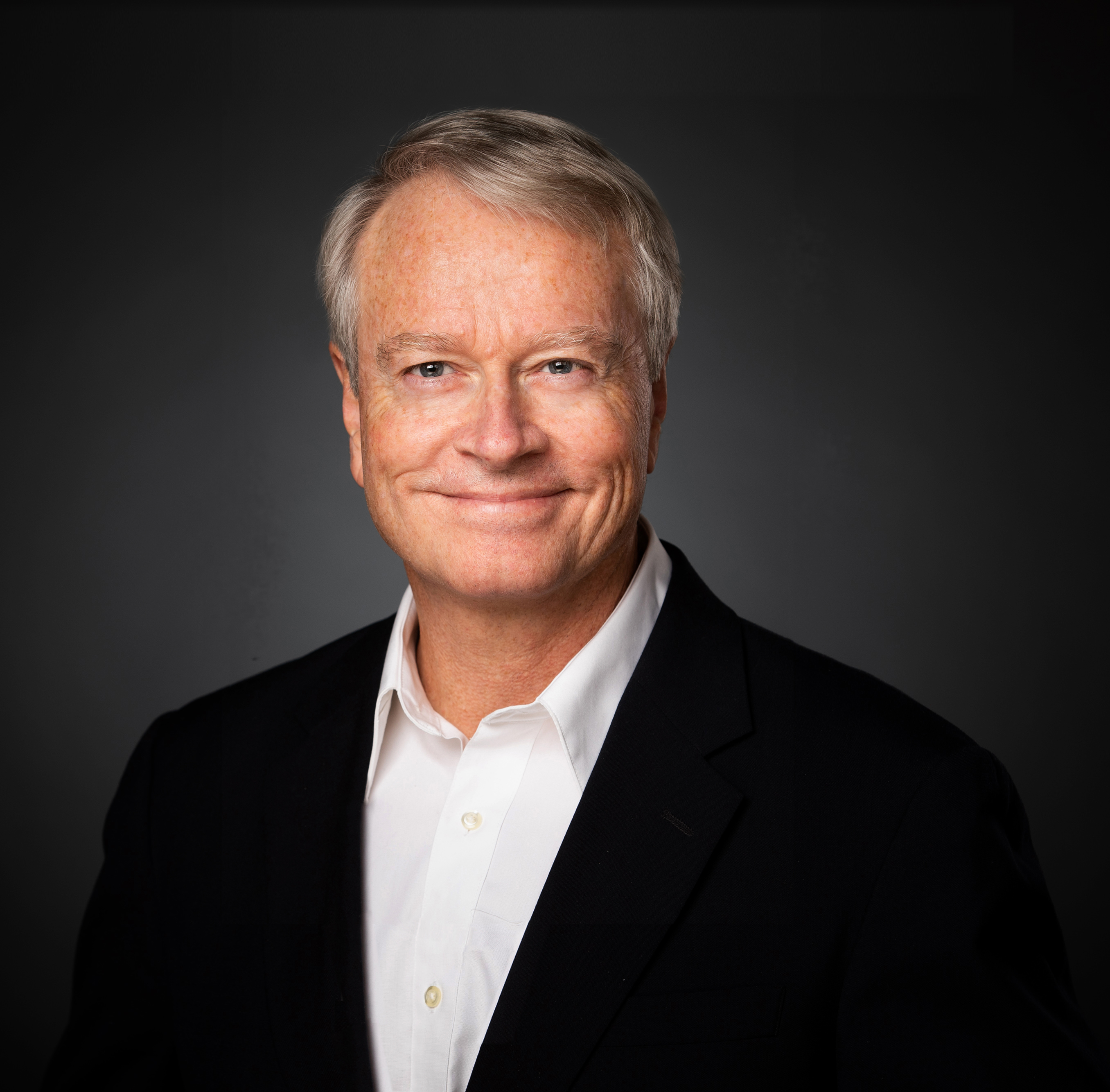

Stephen Ian McIntosh (born July 3, 1960) is an American author, lawyer, and entrepreneur. He was the founder and former CEO of Now & Zen, Inc., a boutique alarm clock company. He writes on the subject of developmental philosophy.

== Education ==
McIntosh graduated from University High School in West Los Angeles in 1978. In 1984, he graduated from the University of Southern California business school, winning the USC Entrepreneur Program's Best Business Plan Award. In 1987 he graduated from the University of Virginia Law School.

== Professional life ==
In 1990 McIntosh became vice president of Earth Wise, Inc. In 1991 Earth Wise was acquired by the Celestial Seasonings tea company, and McIntosh was general counsel. In 1995 he founded Now & Zen, Inc., a boutique alarm clock company and was CEO until 2012, when he turned over the business to his wife, and they closed its retail store to focus on online sales. All Now & Zen products were conceived and designed by McIntosh.

== Integral theory ==
In the late 1990s McIntosh became interested in the integral theory. In 2000 he joined Ken Wilber's Integral Institute, where he worked as a member in consortiums on Integral Art and Integral Business. He left the Integral Institute in 2002.

In 2007 Parragon published McIntosh's book: Integral Consciousness and the Future of Evolution: How the Integral Worldview Is Transforming Politics, Culture and Spirituality. In 2012 Select Books published his book, Evolution's Purpose: An Integral Interpretation of the Scientific Story of Our Origins. In 2015 Quest Books published McIntosh's book on spiritual experience: The Presence of the Infinite: The Spiritual Experience of Beauty, Truth, and Goodness. He has been interviewed by New Dimensions Radio, and the Institute of Noetic Sciences and online at Beyond Awakening, The Daily Evolver, and What Is Enlightenment? Magazine.

In 2012, McIntosh partnered with integral authors and former EnlightenNext editors, Carter Phipps and Elizabeth Debold, and University of Colorado philosopher Michael E. Zimmerman, to found The Institute for Cultural Evolution (ICE). In 2015, The National Journal wrote an article about the Institute for Cultural Evolution, and they wrote an article about a summit they held, Future Right Summit, An Unconventional Summit on the Future of the Right. McIntosh has written numerous articles on politics.

In 2020 McIntosh's published his book, Developmental Politics: How America Can Grow Into a Better Version of Itself. In May 2020, Areo Magazine published McIntosh's article "Towards a Post-Progressive Political Perspective"

In 2020 McIntosh co-authored Conscious Leadership: Elevating Humanity Through Business with Carter Phipps and co-founder of Whole Foods Market, John Mackey.

== Bibliography ==
Books

- 1997 The Golden Mean Book & Caliper Set: Tools for Increased Spiritual Perception (Now & Zen) ISBN 978-0-9647645-3-8
- 2007 Integral Consciousness and the Future of Evolution (Paragon House) ISBN 978-1-55778-867-2
- 2012 Evolution's Purpose: An Integral Interpretation of the Scientific Story of Our Origins (Select Books, New York) ISBN 978-1-59079-220-9
- 2015 The Presence of the Infinite: The Spiritual Experience of Beauty, Truth, and Goodness (Quest Books) ISBN 978-0-8356-0941-8
- 2020 Developmental Politics: How America Can Grow Into a Better Version of Itself (Paragon House) ISBN 978-1557789426
- 2020 Conscious Leadership: Elevating Humanity Through Business (Penguin) ISBN 0593189213
- 2026 Truth Emerging: A Developmental Philosophy of Purpose and Progress (Orbis Books) ISBN 978-1-62698-699-2
