= Kenneth Boulding's evolutionary perspective =

Approach to economic theory based on an evolutionary model

Kenneth E. Boulding's evolutionary perspective is an approach to economics (see also evolutionary economics) put forward most completely in his Ecodynamics (1978) and Evolutionary Economics (1981) had roots in his 1934 work on population theory and the age structure of capital as well as his Reconstruction (1950) with chapter titles like "An Ecological Introduction" and "The Theory of the Economic Organism."

== Perspectives ==
One of the first major perspectives of Boulding's evolutionary perspective was his emphasis on know-how or, to use the term of Vladimir Vernadsky (1926) and Teilhard de Chardin (1959), which Boulding used as well, the "Noosphere." This is the counterpart in social and economic evolution to the role of genetic information and DNA in biological evolution. Just as DNA provides the genetic know-how to produce a chicken from an egg, automotive engineers and their recording devices contain the know-how to produce an automobile.

One of the first major neoclassical casualties of this perspective comes from Boulding's critique of the usual factors of production, land, labor and capital:

It is much more accurate to identify the factors of production as know-how (that is genetic information structure), energy, and materials, for, as we have seen, all processes of production involve the direction of energy by some know-how structure toward the selection, transportation, and transformation of materials into the product.

"Labor" is a category marginally useful to Boulding for studying distribution, but of no use whatever for studying production. Boulding's factors of production are know-how, materials and energy; hence, a theory which holds labor—a heterogeneous collection of artifacts of know-how, energy and materials—as the source of value in the production process has "all the scientific validity of the medieval elements of earth, air, fire, and water."

Another former president of the American Economic Association, Georgescu-Roegen, also began to dissent from orthodox economics for reasons not dissimilar to Boulding. In his classic work, The Entropy Law and the Economic Process, Georgescu-Roegen issued a call for the end of the circular flow diagrams used in mainstream thought and textbooks in which the production and circulation process are detached from the physical reality, the scale, of the planet's resources and pollution sinks. He called for greater attention to be given to the second law of thermodynamics – that it be treated as a cornerstone of the mainstream paradigm. Boulding can be seen as addressing this call. Once one considers the possibility that labor can be seen as an intermediate surrogate for more fundamental factors, like know-how, materials and energy, then it is a short step to treat (as Boulding sometimes does) capital as a surrogate for know-how and land as surrogate for material resources and the traditional factors of production, land, labor and capital, are easily rearticulated as know-how, energy and materials. If and when that sort of transformation in thought takes place, professional attention will immediately be focused on the throughput resulting from the production and consumption process. With the rising perception of environmental degradation and the unrelenting thrust of the environmental movement, there is every reason to expect the profession to include throughput as a centerpiece in the production process. Boulding's factors of production accomplish this task.

== Post-civilized society ==
Once the traditional factor of production (i.e. capital) is reinterpreted as know-how, one can easily conclude that know-how and the growth of knowledge are "the essential key to economic development. Investment, financial systems and economic organizations and institutions are in a sense only the machinery by which a knowledge process is created and expressed." ("Economic Development as an Evolutionary System"). Boulding (1961) (1964) embedded his view of development in a long-term perspective that envisages us as moving from our current "civilized society" to "post-civilized society". The driving force of this movement is science or the culture that supports science. Development of the third world is a critical part of the movement to a "post-civilized society".

His "post-civilized society" is not the stationary state of John Stuart Mill or Herman Daly, but it does have a stable population. As a young man in his twenties, Boulding took a position that we now refer to as neo-Malthusian. He argued that "the indication seems to be" that the (per-capita) income level at which the western world would only reproduce itself is one "that the actual standard of life can never reach." (1939, 107) Thirty years later, still prior to Paul Ehrlich's Population Bomb (1969) and the limits-to-growth literature (e.g., Meadows, 1971), Boulding argued (1965) that it "is hard to avoid considerable pessimism" about the prospects of development, especially in countries with high birth rates, which could undermine the great potential of a post-civilized society.

His major contribution to this problem is probably the argument (1964) for tradable birth-right permits. His dissidence on this issue is political – it runs against the grain of the political climate both then and now. If he was correct about the emerging seriousness of the population problem and if that level of concern is one day reflected in popular political sentiment, there is every reason to expect the profession to embrace Boulding's call for tradable birth-right permits, since it is based squarely on neoclassical concern for efficiency.

== Criticism of mainstream economists ==
Boulding is widely known for his criticism of mainstream economists' use of equilibrium analysis and, in particular, for the profession's acceptance of what Boulding calls "Samuelson's dynamics" (originating with the Foundations (1947)). To appreciate his position, it is important to reflect on the different time scales in biological evolution and what Boulding calls social or societal evolution. With the advent of the human capacity for developing complex images (1950), social evolution has proceeded orders of magnitude faster than biological evolution. Changes, for example, in the size of the human brain have occurred orders of magnitude more slowly than social and economic changes in the last ten millennia.

Yet slower than biological evolution is the time scale of astronomical change. The relations among the celestial bodies of the Solar System were first depicted mathematically by Newton. The precision with which the field of celestial mechanics is able to describe the movements of bodies of the Solar System is due to the incredibly slow time scale of astronomical, evolutionary change. Boulding's longstanding concern was that equilibrium analysis, market dynamics and growth theory as practised in conventional economics are based on the mathematics of difference and differential equations, as found in celestial mechanics.

Along with his critique of equilibrium analysis, he has the following critique with the profession's methodological emphasis on prediction as being the criterion of good theory:

Prediction of the future is possible only in systems that have stable parameters like celestial mechanics. The only reason why prediction is so successful in celestial mechanics is that the evolution of the solar system has ground to a halt in what is essentially a dynamic equilibrium with stable parameters. Evolutionary systems, however, by their very nature have unstable parameters. They are disequilibrium systems and in such systems our power of prediction, though not zero, is very limited because of the unpredictability of the parameters themselves. If, of course, it were possible to predict the change in the parameters, then there would be other parameters which were unchanged, but the search for ultimately stable parameters in evolutionary systems is futile, for they probably do not exist.... Social systems have Heisenberg principles all over the place, for we cannot predict the future without changing it.

There is a fundamental theorem in information theory that says information has to be surprising. Equilibrium can't exist in a system in which information is an essential element. The parameters are always changing. I describe econometrics as the attempt to find the celestial mechanics of non-existent universes. (1991)

Biological evolution gives considerable emphasis to the ability of organisms to adapt to unpredictable change—their survival value. In his words,

...the perception of potential threats to survival may be much more important in determining behavior than the perceptions of potential profits, so that profit maximization is not really the driving force. It is fear of loss rather than hope of gain that limits our behavior.

Boulding's observation or conjecture was made prior to widespread adoption of the same idea by economists in the eighties following work done in psychology in the seventies for which a Nobel prize was awarded in 2002.
