= Now & Zen =

American company

- Founded: January 1995 in Boulder, Colorado, United States
- Founder: Steve McIntosh

Now & Zen, Inc. is an American company founded by Steve McIntosh in January 1995, that is based in Boulder, Colorado. The Zen Alarm Clock was introduced in early 1996. McIntosh stepped down as CEO in 2012.

== Patents ==
Now & Zen holds two U.S. patents covering design and utility aspects of its chiming alarm clocks: U.S. Patent No. Des. 390,121, (issued February 3, 1998) and U.S. Patent No. US 6,819,635 B2 (issued November 16, 2004).

== Products ==
All Now & Zen products were invented and designed by founder and former CEO Steve McIntosh. Early in its history the company produced a variety of household products; it later focused on alarm clocks and timers

The Zen Alarm Clock uses a series of progressive acoustic chimes to wake people gradually. In 2001, the company introduced a portable digital version of its chiming alarm clock. In 2005, the company introduced an alarm clock and timer featuring a six-inch brass bowl-gong, called The Zen Timepiece.

== Reviews ==
The Zen Alarm Clock has been reviewed by major media outlets including The New York Times, The Los Angeles Times, the Good Morning America television show, The Washington Post, and Good Housekeeping Magazine.

== Criticism ==
The Zen Alarm Clock's New Age positioning received mixed responses from reviewers. In his review of the product in The New York Times, reviewer William L. Hamilton wrote: "It is like a monk losing his temper — om to OM! Now! Tranquil, tenacious — the Dalai Lama as drill sergeant". Similarly, Dads Magazine referred to the aesthetics of the triangular shaped version of the clock as a "hippie carpenter contraption," but nevertheless praised the way it woke users gently and gradually. Moreover, despite the moderate success of The Zen Alarm Clock, the company has also had some failures, such as The Affirmation Station, introduced in 1998, which was designed to wake users with their personal affirmations. However, the product failed to gain consumer acceptance and was discontinued after three years on the market.
