= Elise M. Boulding =

Norwegian-American sociologist of peace studies (1920–2010)

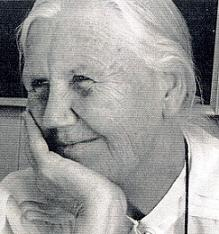
- Boulding in an unknown date
- Born: Elise Biorn-Hansen; 6 July 1920; Oslo, Norway
- Died: 24 June 2010 (aged 89); Needham, Massachusetts, U.S.
- Education: University of Michigan
- Occupation: Sociologist
- Spouse: Kenneth Boulding (m. 1941; died 1993)
- Children: 5, including William Frederick Boulding

Elise M. Boulding (/ˈboʊldɪŋ/; July 6, 1920 – June 24, 2010) was a Norwegian-born American Quaker sociologist and author, seen as a major contributor to creating the academic discipline of Peace and Conflict Studies. Her holistic, multidimensional approach to peace research sets her apart as an important scholar and activist in multiple fields. Her written works span several decades and range from discussion of family as a foundation for peace, to Quaker spirituality, to reinventing the international "global culture". Particularly of note is her emphasis on women and family in the peace process. Boulding was inducted into the Colorado Women's Hall of Fame in 1996.

== Early life and education ==
Elise Biorn-Hansen was born in Oslo, Norway in 1920. Her family moved to the United States when she was three years old. She and her family were greatly affected by the outbreak of World War II and the German invasion of Norway. Elise became strongly convinced by living through the World War II years that violence was not the answer to the world's problems and that if even her peaceful homeland was at risk, violence was truly a systemic world concern. In her youth, she became active in anti-war activities and converted to a historic peace church, the Religious Society of Friends (Quakers).

== Adult life ==
It was at a Quaker meeting in May 1941 that she met her future husband, Kenneth Boulding (1910–1993), a respected English economist who would collaborate extensively with Elise on her peace work.

Her writing on the foundations of peace would reflect her valuation of women, children and family in the peace process. She believed the family unit, and especially the role of women within that unit, was crucial to the global peace movement. After working at Iowa State College (here she received her master's degree in sociology and at the University of Colorado at Boulder, she and Kenneth were invited to become scholars in residence at Dartmouth College after Elise completed her PhD in sociology at the University of Michigan. While at Dartmouth, she chaired the Sociology Department and developed the nation's first Peace Studies program there. She is credited with greatly advancing the academic study of peace through her work at Dartmouth.

Boulding held many leadership positions in peace- and social justice-related groups, from chairing the Women's International League for Peace and Freedom (WILPF) to creating the International Peace Research Association (IPRA) to work with the United Nations through UNESCO and the University of the United Nations. She is considered to be one of the most influential peace researchers and activists of the 20th century. On June 11, 2000, the Peace Abbey, in Sherborn, Massachusetts, awarded Elise Boulding the Courage of Conscience award for her lifelong commitment and contributions to peace and justice, envisioning the Peaceable Kingdom as a shared reality.

== Personal life ==
The Bouldings raised five children, with Elise serving as both homemaker and activist.

== Work ==
=== The Religious Society of Friends ===
Boulding's Quaker faith played a vital role in her focus and development as a sociologist and peace activist. She found the Religious Society of Friends in young adulthood, but did not have a particularly religious upbringing. Though there was a church near her childhood home that had services in Norwegian (her family had emigrated from Norway), her family did not attend. Her father would read the story of Jesus from the Bible on Christmas Eve, and she knew the Lord's Prayer in Norwegian all her life. Despite the lack of structured religion in her youth, she claims she felt the presence of God as a young child, and when she was 9 years old she began attending a local Protestant church on her own. She developed a relationship with the minister's wife, who served as a spiritual mentor of sorts for the young Elise. In her teens, however, she recalls a longing to know "god" (she often used a lowercase "g" in referring to God in her personal writings) but felt that "no religion can quite fulfill [her] needs, so [she] will make [her] own religion". She also was strongly influenced by her mother, who in Norway had been involved in peace parades and was a social worker for girls who worked in Norwegian factories. Elise shared her mother's nostalgia for Norway, and always thought of her homeland as a "safe place" until her last year of college when the Nazis invaded it. It was then that she embraced pacifism, and began attending Quaker meetings that she had been introduced to by college friends. She decided that if "safe places" were to exist in the world, she would have to work for them, and this was her calling as a Friend.

Soon after becoming a Quaker, Elise met her husband, Kenneth, who was also a Friend. He was an accomplished academic economist, international peace researcher, and poet when the couple met, and Elise names him as her strongest influence throughout her life. Together they moved to various universities and colleges where Kenneth taught and began a family. All the while, Elise was involved in different peace organizations, such as the Women's International League for Peace and Freedom, and also introduced peace studies to public schools. Out of these experiences, Elise focused on the networking of international religious and/or peace organizations and education. She wrote several pamphlets on the Quaker educational philosophy. The Religious Society of Friends does not separate the spiritual and secular worlds, and see God as being present in all people.

Elise viewed listening as the key to advancing world peace and nonviolence. She published numerous works and gave frequent talks on this and related subjects. It is what she strove for in the many Friends' organizations and newsletters she contributed to or developed, among them the American Friends Service Committee and the Committee on Friends Responsibilities in Higher Education and Research.

=== The theory of peace as an everyday process ===
A major theoretical focus for Boulding was the idea of peace as a daily process. She challenged the idea of peace as a dull, static process and advocated for a concept she termed "peaceableness." Her work emphasized "personal and interpersonal promotion of peace." This peace theory involved shaping and reshaping understandings and behaviors to adapt to a constantly changing world and sustain well-being for all.

Boulding felt in order to accomplish peace, one must review the history of conflicts. No two human beings are the same and as a result conflict becomes an integral part of any social order. Struggles and conflicts over politics and religion have always been a part of society but the world's expanding interdependence makes it necessary to promote openness and flexibility for the sake of coexistence. Peace culture welcomes differences, recognizing them as potential sources of conflict, but also as a starting point for progress. By reviewing the history of conflict, Boulding noticed that two groups in society were underrepresented who could address this new perspective on peace, especially beginning on the micro level of the family unit.

Women and children are vital and under appreciated players in the peace process. Boulding felt children "gentle" the human species. By this, she meant that adults respond to children generally with affection and compassion. She argued that it is crucial to long-term societal changes that children be involved. She felt that from the youngest of ages children should be socialized to approach conflicts and problems critically and non-confrontationally. Women, being mothers, have a great influence in setting the foundation for this peace culture by teaching their children.

... We're never going to have respectful and reverential relationships with the planet- and sensible policies about what we put in the air, the soil, the water – if very young children don't begin learning about these things literally in their houses, backyards, streets and schools. We need to have human beings who are oriented that way from their earliest memories.

=== Women's role in history and the peace process ===
Boulding's book The Underside of History: A View of Women through Time, first published 1976, explored the changing roles of women from Paleolithic times to the present. She attempted to understand what she described as women's "underlife" and men's "overlife" in social roles. Boulding likened modern women's roles to that of inmates: the household imprisons them and expects them to be "on call" at all times to provide for their husbands and children. Women are, in a sense, stripped of their identity, autonomy and privacy and considered "under" their family and husbands.

However, this needs not always be the case, Boulding asserts. In hunter-gatherer communities female-male relationships were egalitarian. Men's work was dedicated to hunting, providing about 20% of the food. Women, on the other hand, provided the other 80% of the food through gathering and capturing small game near their campsites; they were also what Boulding calls the 'breeder-feeders,' producing and feeding the family. In these communities, women thus filled the triple role of 'breeder-feeder-producers'.

As communities moved from hunting/gathering to agricultural communities, women's and men's roles further differentiated. Women stayed close to where the crops were planted while men continued to hunt. Men were now away hunting for days while women stayed in the same spot. Men's mobility allowed them to acquire a body of knowledge about distant places and people which women lacked. As men began to trade with other communities, women's work was further devalued: men were able to supply their produce to other villages and gain otherwise unavailable goods in return.

Trading led to urbanization: men moved to jobs in cities, while women stayed at home with the family. This created a differentiation between women's and men's spaces: women's space was private (dedans), men's was public (dehors). When women eventually entered the wage market, they did so with unequal wages because their role in society had been devalued on the family level to the private sphere.

Historically there have been various alternatives to the familial roles for women: celibacy (monasticism), beguinage (female urban secular communes), hermitesses (isolated single women as sages/healers) and vagabonds. However, during the sixteenth and seventeenth centuries these roles disappeared because they were often seen as threats to a male-dominated society (as in the case of hermitesses accused of witchcraft and murdered).

The Renaissance and Enlightenment furthered male domination through discoveries about the nature of man and men's organizations, creating individualism and less concentration of the family.

In the nineteenth and twentieth centuries, women worked to gain power and move from the dedans to the dehors. Women started to recognize the fictions of male guardianship and many rebelled. Boulding considers the foundation for peace to be empowering women to deconstruct a history of patriarchy and devaluation and reconstruct truly equality, appreciating certain differences between the sexes.

=== The role of family in the peace process ===
Boulding claimed that families are the "practice ground for making history". Boulding emphasizes family as the environment that grounds individuals for all their future endeavors. As a family sociologist, Boulding believed in the inherent worth of every child. This belief stems from her devotion to Quakerism. (See below) From her own experience as a mother, as well as the knowledge she acquired through research, Boulding developed an ideology that places importance on the influence children have on the greater society. She believed that children would be co-creators of a reformed visionary future if adults would accept their influence. Boulding believed that within the dynamics of a family parents must take their children seriously, listen and converse whole-heartedly, and finally fully accept their ability to influence parents own social imagination.

Boulding has a collection of writings, but none represent her views on the importance of family quite as well as One Small Plot of Heaven: Reflections on Family Life by a Quaker Sociologist. This represents, in a most complete sense, her thoughts on families, parenting and the important relationship that exists between the family, God and the individual's Quaker worship. She also emphasizes the importance of the "personhood of children", the acknowledgment of time in solitude, and the need for interactions across age gaps

Boulding suggests that networking and partnerships built between men, women and children are what will cultivate the peace culture.

We must look towards societies that set a high value on nonaggression and noncompetitive ness, and therefore handle conflicts by nonviolent means. We can see how child rearing patterns produce nurturing adult behaviors.

=== "Building a Global Civic Culture" ===
Boulding offers "Building a Global Civic Culture" as a holistic first step towards solving international conflicts. She envisions a "global civic culture" as not simply made of nation states but as a global community of human beings. The book enforces the idea of thinking globally on a microcosmic level to facilitate solving problems in a peaceful international order. Boulding believed that a civic world order could become a reality, while acknowledging the strife that exists now. Building a Global Civic Culture is geared toward addressing the world's problems and offering ideas for solutions.

To create peace, Boulding believes that we must all become teachers and develop new learning communities. Building a Global Civic Culture presented the idea that individuals of all ages would teach, and age groups would teach each other. This is because she believed that how we perceive events unique to our generation shapes the lens through which we each see later events.

Building a Global Civic Culture presents humans as intuitive, creative animals with cognitive-analytic reasoning abilities and the ability to think outside the box. Through this, she believes we as human animals can grasp complex wholes from partial sets of facts. Boulding states that for most of us, education has been tied to the maxim "stick to the facts, no need for imaginative thinking", and therefore, we are taught in school that imagination and intuition are aspects of the daydreamer, not the true student. To the contrary, Boulding states we need to harness both intuition and imagination to solve world crises. The book encourages the reader to pursue teaching and problem solving, including a framework of exercises as support.

== See also ==
- List of peace activists

== Selected publications ==
- The Underside of History: A View of Women through Time (New York, NY: Halsted, 1976)
- Women in the Twentieth Century World (New York, NY: Halsted, 1977)
- Children's Rights and the Wheel of Life (New Brunswick, NJ: Transaction, 1979)
- Building a Global Civic Culture: Education for an Interdependent World (New York, NY: Teachers College Press, 1988)
- One Small Plot of Heaven: Reflections on Family Life by a Quaker Sociologist (Philadelphia, PA: Pendle Hill Press, 1989)
- Cultures of Peace: The Hidden Side of History (Syracuse, NY: Syracuse University Press, 2000)
- Into Full Flower: Making Peace Cultures Happen, with Daisaku Ikeda (Dialogue Path Press, 2010)
