= Thomas S. Robertson =

Scottish-American academic

- Education: Wayne State University; Northwestern University
- Occupations: professor, academic administrator
- Known for: Former dean of the Wharton School of the University of Pennsylvania

Thomas S. Robertson is a Scottish-born American academic. He is the Professor of Marketing at the Wharton School of the University of Pennsylvania, where he was also the dean from 2007 to 2014.

== Early life and education ==
Thomas S. Robertson was born in Scotland. He graduated from the Wayne State University, then earned a Master of Arts degree in sociology and a Ph.D. from the Kellogg School of Management.

== Career ==
Robertson was an assistant professor at the UCLA Anderson School of Management from 1966 to 1968 and at the Harvard Business School from 1968 to 1971. He joined the Wharton School of the University of Pennsylvania as a tenured associate professor in 1971, and he was promoted to full professor in 1976. He was the Pomerantz Professor from 1987 to 1994. He has published research in academic journals like the MIT Sloan Management Review, the Journal of Marketing and the International Journal of Research in Marketing.

Robertson was the deputy dean of the London Business School from 1994 to 1998. He was the dean of Emory University's Goizueta Business School from 1998 to 2004. He returned to Wharton in 2007, where he served as the dean until 2014, and he was succeeded by Geoffrey Garrett. As dean, Robertson earned $771,956 in 2014. Since July 2014, Robertson has been the Joshua J. Harris Professor of Marketing at Wharton. He is also the executive director of the Wharton-INSEAD Alliance. Robertson serves on the board of directors of The Carlyle Group.
