= Orfalea College of Business =

Business school of California Polytechnic State University

Coordinates: 35.3000°N 120.6653°W

The Orfalea College of Business
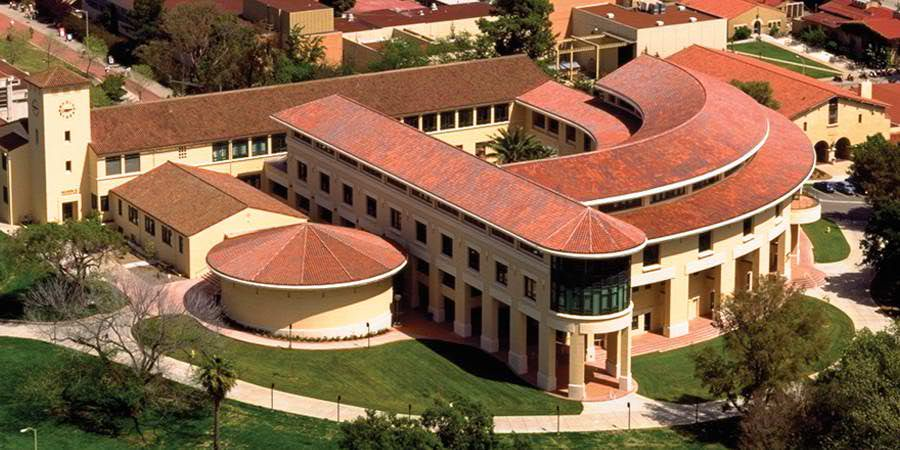
- Motto: Learn By Doing
- Type: Public
- Established: 1959
- Parent institution: California Polytechnic State University
- Accreditation: AACSB, ATMAE
- Dean: Damon Fleming
- Faculty: 117 (2019 Fall)
- Undergraduates: 2,870 (2019 Fall)
- Postgraduates: 41 (2019 Fall)
- Location: San Luis Obispo, California
- Website: www.cob.calpoly.edu

The Orfalea College of Business is one of six colleges at California Polytechnic State University in San Luis Obispo, California. The business school was established in 1959 and later named after Paul Orfalea, founder of Kinko’s. The Orfalea College of Business is accredited by the Association to Advance Collegiate Schools of Business (AACSB) and offers a range of undergraduate and graduate programs.

== History ==
Business education at Cal Poly began in 1921 with the introduction of commercial courses aimed at training students for careers in business. The Orfalea College of Business was officially established in 1959 as a Business Department within the Sciences Division. In 1962, it became part of the Applied Arts Division, and in 1970, it was incorporated into the School of Business and Social Sciences. By 1977, it was recognized as the School of Business, and in 1992, it was elevated to the College of Business.

In 1987, the college achieved accreditation from the AACSB. The current building housing the college was inaugurated in 1992. In 2001, the college was renamed the Orfalea College of Business following a $15 million donation from Paul Orfalea, founder of Kinko’s. In 2010, the Orfalea College of Business launched the Center for Innovation and Entrepreneurship, which supports students in launching startups through initiatives such as the Hatchery, HotHouse Accelerator, and Incubator.

== Rankings ==
- Forbes named Cal Poly as California’s Best Public-Master’s University in 2018.
- Cal Poly was recognized as “Best in the West” for the 26th consecutive year by U.S. News & World Report in 2018.
- ValueColleges.com ranked the Cal Poly M.S. Tax Program No. 1 in the Nation for return on investment.
- Additionally, the Cal Poly Packaging Program was ranked No. 1 in the Nation in 2017.
- In 2016, Bloomberg Businessweek ranked the Orfalea College of Business No. 59 out of 114 colleges and universities in its annual list of top undergraduate business programs. The publication also listed the undergraduate program as No. 5 in the nation for return on investment in 2014.

== Undergraduate ==
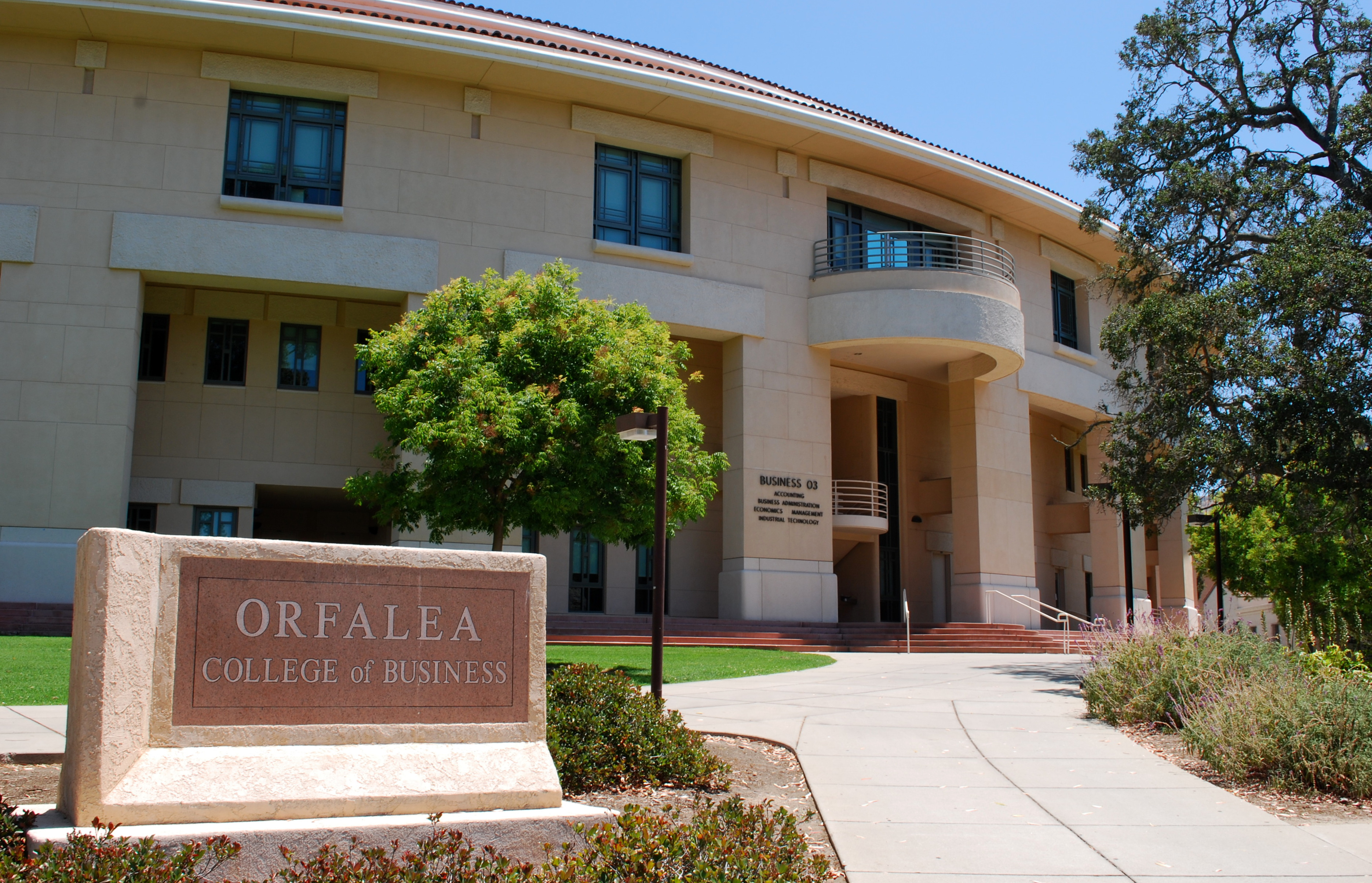
Orfalea College of Business building.

=== Admissions ===
For 2024, the Orfalea College of Business received 9,713 applications and accepted 2,715 students, resulting in an acceptance rate of approximately 27.9%. The average GPA range of admitted students was 4.04 to 4.25.

=== Fields of Study ===
The Orfalea College of Business offers three majors, four minors, and nine areas of concentration within the Business Administration and Economics Department. Undergraduate students must declare a concentration by the end of their second year, while transfer students have until the end of their first year to do so. Students may declare one concentration but can pursue multiple minors available across the university. Business Administration is the largest undergraduate major at Cal Poly, with 2,870 undergraduate students enrolled in Fall 2019.

- Business Administration
- Economics
- Industrial Technology and Packaging

==== Areas of Concentration ====
- Accounting and Law
- Consumer Packaging
- Entrepreneurship
- Financial Management
- Information Systems
- Management and Human Resources
- Marketing
- Quantitative Analysis
- Real Estate Finance

==== Minors ====
- Accounting
- Economics
- Entrepreneurship
- Integrated Marketing Communications
- Industrial Technology
- Packaging
- Sales

== Graduate ==
- MBA
- MS Accounting
- MS Business Analytics
- MS Packaging Value Chain
- MS Quantitative Economics
- MS Taxation

== Facilities ==
The Orfalea College of Business is housed in a dedicated building that was opened in 1992. The college’s facilities include classrooms, collaborative spaces, and specialized labs to support business education and innovation. The college is situated in front of the Richard O’Neill Green lawn, providing a central location within the campus.

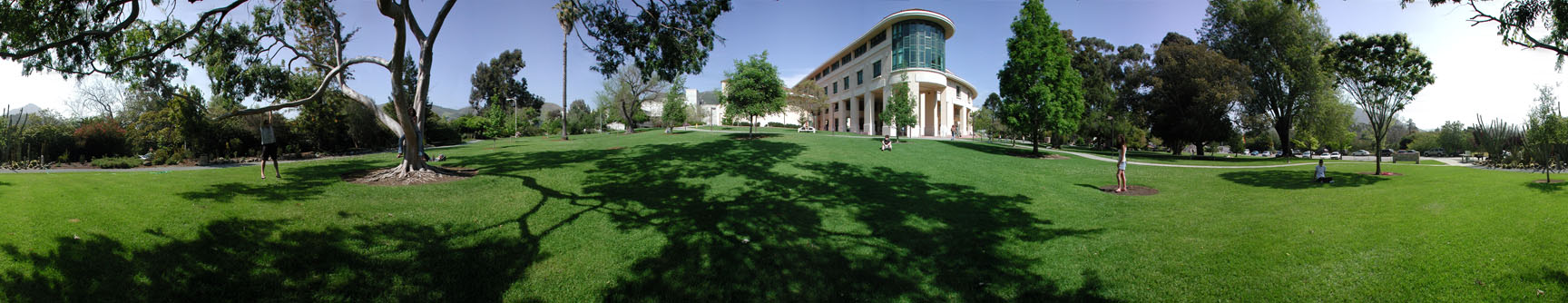
The Orfalea College of Business is situated in front of the Richard O’Neill Green lawn.

== Innovation and Entrepreneurship ==
The Cal Poly Center for Innovation and Entrepreneurship, established in 2010, is part of the Orfalea College of Business. The center supports student entrepreneurship through initiatives like the Hatchery, HotHouse Accelerator, and Incubator, providing resources and mentorship to help students start and grow their own businesses.

== See also ==
- California Polytechnic State University
- Business
