= Kenneth E. Boulding =

British-American economist (1910–1993)

K. E. Boulding
- Born: Kenneth Ewart Boulding; 18 January 1910; Liverpool, UK
- Died: 18 March 1993 (aged 83); Boulder, Colorado, US
- Education: Oxford University
- Known for: Boulding's Hierarchy; Kenneth Boulding's evolutionary perspective Spaceship Earth; Loss-of-strength gradient
- Spouse: Elise M. Boulding (m. 1941)
- Children: 5, including William Frederick Boulding
- Awards: John Bates Clark Medal (1949); 33 honorary degrees
- Scientific career
- Fields: Economics; Systems theory Evolutionary economics
- Workplaces: University of Edinburgh; Colgate University; Iowa State University; University of Michigan; The University of the West Indies; University of Colorado at Boulder

Kenneth Ewart Boulding (/ˈboʊldɪŋ/; January 18, 1910 – March 18, 1993) was an English-born American economist, educator, peace activist, and interdisciplinary philosopher. Boulding was the author of two citation classics: The Image: Knowledge in Life and Society (1956) and Conflict and Defense: A General Theory (1962). He was co-founder of general systems theory and founder of numerous ongoing intellectual projects in economics and social science. He was married to sociologist Elise M. Boulding.

== Early life and education ==
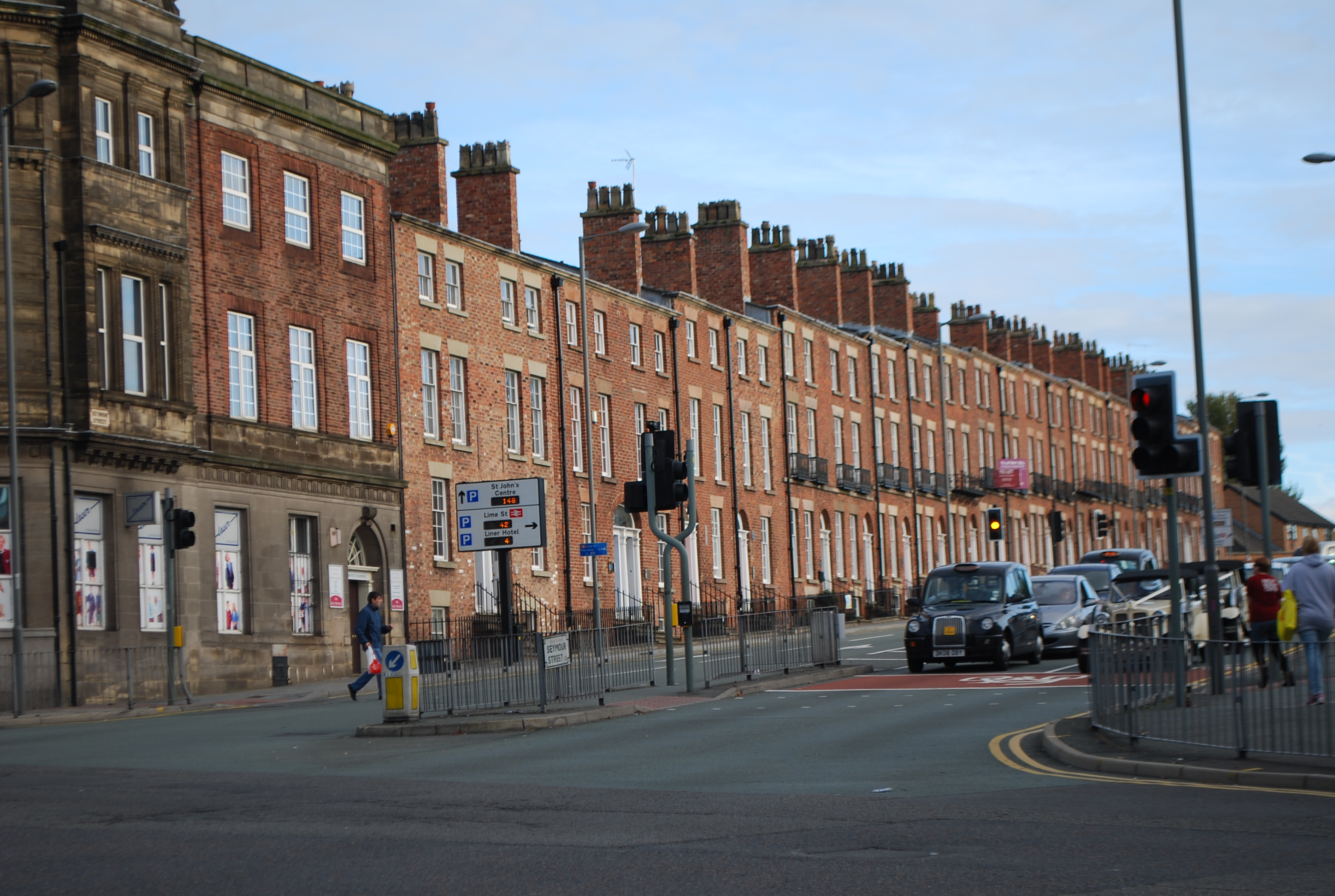
Seymour Street, Liverpool

Boulding was born and raised in Liverpool, England, the only child of William C. Boulding and Elizabeth Ann Boulding. His father was a gas fitter and a lay preacher in the Wesleyan Methodist Church, and his mother was a housewife. Boulding's middle name Ewart came from William Ewart Gladstone, of whom his father was a great admirer. In his adolescent years Boulding became interested in pacifism and joined the Religious Society of Friends.

After attending Liverpool Collegiate School on a scholarship, Boulding won a chemistry scholarship to Oxford University at New College in 1929. He soon transferred to Philosophy, Politics and Economics. His economics tutors were Henry Phelps Brown, and Maurice Allen (1908–1988), who would become a director of the Bank of England in the late 1960s. Boulding obtained a First in economics in 1931. In his last year he wrote "The Place of the 'Displacement Cost' Concept in Economic Theory", which was accepted and published in The Economic Journal, after extensive comments by its editor John Maynard Keynes.

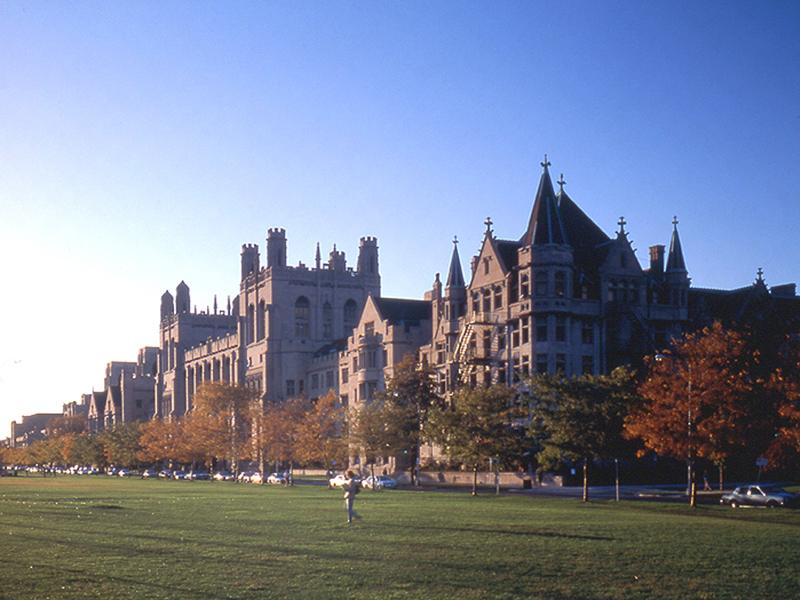
University of Chicago

On a small university scholarship Boulding spent another year at Oxford doing graduate work, which resulted in a thesis on capital movements. While he was turned down for a fellowship for Christ Church, Oxford, in 1932 he did win a Commonwealth Fellowship to the University of Chicago. En route he became "quite well acquainted" with Joseph Schumpeter.

On the fellowship from 1932 to 1934, Boulding continued his economics studies at Chicago and at Harvard University. Although Jacob Viner encouraged him to focus on his PhD work, he studied with Schumpeter, took classes from Henry Schultz and Frank Knight, and wrote some of his own articles. At Chicago, he became friends with another graduate student, Albert Gailord Hart.

His studies with Schumpeter were interrupted by a spontaneous pneumothorax ('collapsed lung'). After recovery he spent the last six months of his Commonwealth Fellowship in Chicago, writing articles on capital theory. Two of those articles, "The Application of the Pure Theory of Population Change to the Theory of Capital", and "The Theory of a Single Investment", were published in The Quarterly Journal of Economics in 1934–1935, and were the topic of Frank H. Knight's reflection the next year. After returning to the UK for three years, Boulding settled in the U.S. He was granted citizenship in 1948.

== Career ==
=== University of Edinburgh, 1934-1937 ===
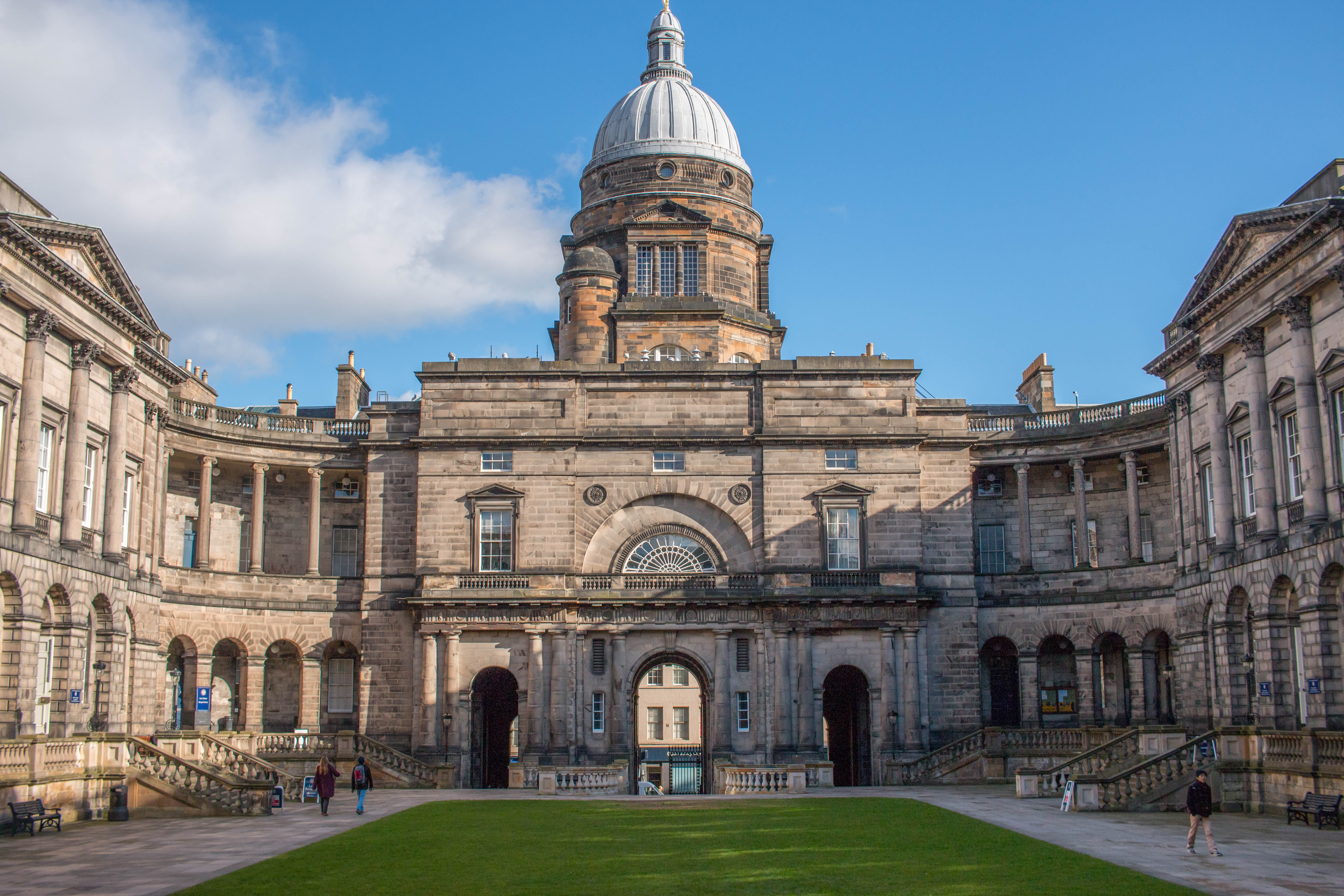
University of Edinburgh

Under the terms of his Commonwealth Fellowship Boulding returned to the UK in the summer of 1934, and obtained a three-year position in economics at the University of Edinburgh. Academic life at the university seemed very dead to him, and he made himself unpopular with a speech to students that was published in The Scotsman with the headline, "Scottish University Sitting on Haunches for the last Fifty Years."

In those days Boulding was actively involved in the Quaker community, writing a pamphlet on nonviolent methods in 1936 and drafting a letter for the Friends to the prime minister, asking Britain to disclaim the "war guilt" clauses in the Treaty of Versailles and move toward a more just peace.

During this period Boulding learned about Paton's (1922) Accounting Theory and the (1916) Principles of Accounting. He was influenced by Paton's approach and this led him to view the firm as "governed by a principle that might be called the homeostasis of the constant changing balance sheet". Boulding (1989) explained that: "In the short run, the firm simply responded to changes in the balance sheet resulting from purchases. When customers purchased finished goods, inventory went down, cash went up, and the cash would be spent on labour and materials to make more finished goods. This equilibrium balance sheet, however, would be constantly changing as technologies, new goods, and new enterprises came into play."

In 1935, in his second year in Edinburgh, Frank H. Knight published an article on his work, entitled "The theory of investment once more: Mr. Boulding and the Austrians," in The Quarterly Journal of Economics. This brought Boulding at the age of 24 to prominence as a notable intellectual in the social sciences.

=== US academic life, 1937-1975 ===
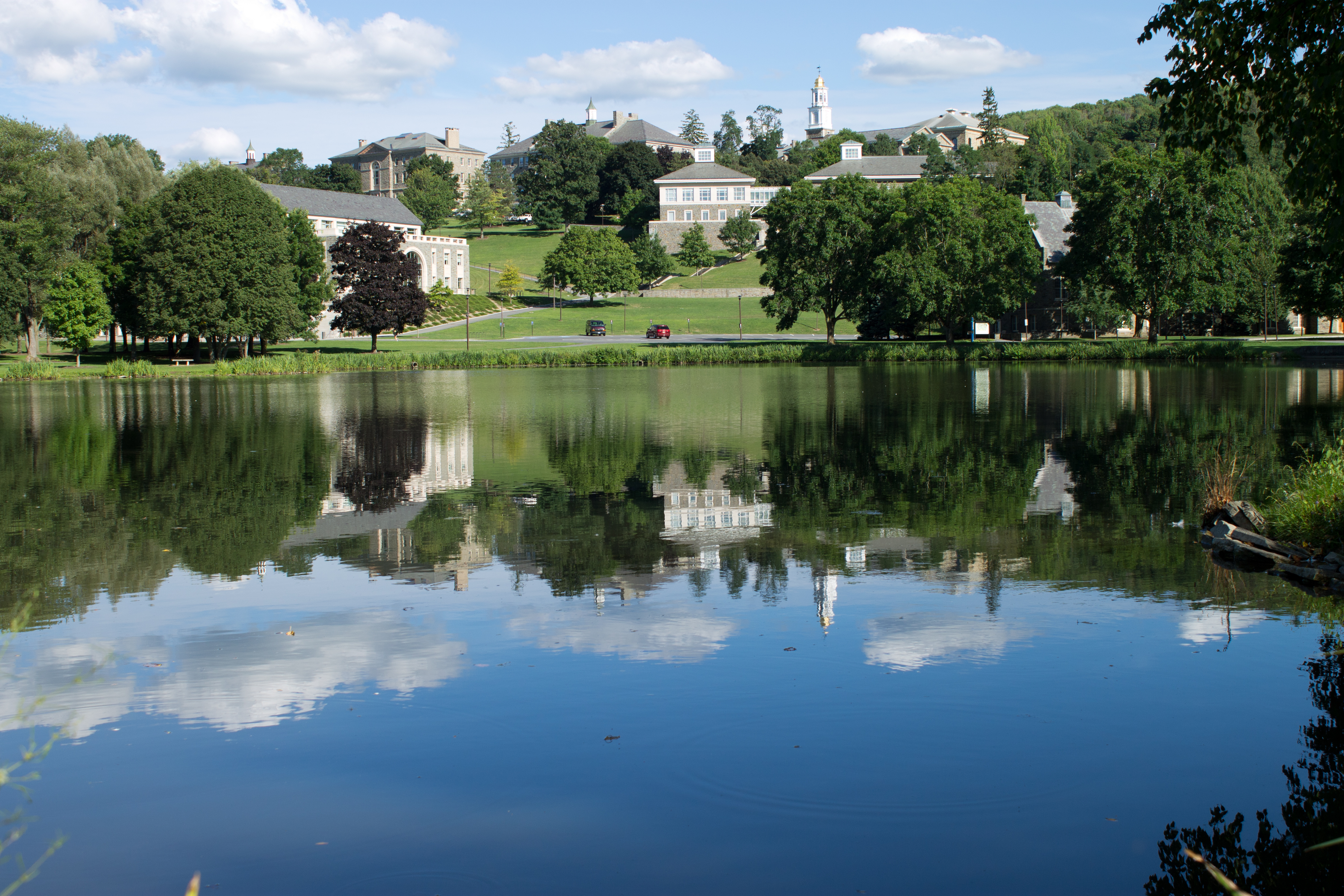
Colgate University campus

In the summer of 1937 Boulding returned to the US to attend a world congress of Quakers in Philadelphia. He obtained a faculty position in upstate New York at Colgate University. From 1937 to 1941 he taught economics there. Fontaine (2010) summarized his stay:

... Boulding enjoyed the congenial surroundings of Colgate University. He did not feel alienated from his colleagues and acquaintances, as he had in British academic circles. For the first two years, social and professional life was fulfilling. But from September 1939, the invasion of Poland and his home country's declaration of war on Germany caused increasing emotional distress and strong feelings of hate against the Germans. His Quaker convictions were shaken until he had a mystical experience in May 1940 which restored his faith in pacifism...

In a state of spiritual crisis Boulding managed to finish his textbook, Economic Analysis, which he had started in the free summer semesters at Colgate in the previous two years. This work would become a bestseller and earned him even more respect in the field of economics.

From 1942 to 1943, Boulding taught at Fisk University, a historically black school in Nashville, Tennessee.

From 1945 to 1949 he was a faculty member of Iowa State College at Ames, Iowa, now Iowa State University. From 1949 to 1967 he was a faculty member of the University of Michigan.

In 1967, he joined the faculty of the University of Colorado at Boulder, where he remained until his retirement.

A number of national and regional scholarly societies elected Boulding as their president, including the American Economic Association in 1968–69, the Society for General Systems Research, the American Association for the Advancement of Science (AAAS) in 1980, the International Studies Association, the Peace Research Society, and the Association for the Study of the Grants Economy. In 1978 Larry D. Singell stated:

The election of Kenneth Boulding as president-elect of the AAAS continues the tradition of selecting an individual who is not only distinguished because of significant and fundamental contributions to a particular field of science but who also has the knowledge and vision to look at science as a whole and accordingly to represent the entire scientific community.

Boulding was nominated for the Nobel Prize at different times for both peace and economics. He was an elected member of the American Academy of Arts and Sciences (1957), the American Philosophical Society (1960), and the United States National Academy of Sciences (1975).

== Personal life ==
In 1941 Boulding met his wife Elise. They had 5 children and were active members of the Religious Society of Friends, or Quakers. He took part in Quaker gatherings, served on committees, and spoke to and about the Friends. The two were members of meetings in Nashville, Ann Arbor, and Boulder. Although he usually stuttered, when he ministered at a Friends meeting, he spoke fluently.

Boulding was instrumental in organizing the first Vietnam War teach-in at the University of Michigan in March, 1965. He later spoke on the steps of the Hatcher Graduate Library at the university and was pelted with snowballs by a group of disagreeing students.

In March 1977, he conducted a silent vigil at the headquarters of the American Friends Service Committee in Philadelphia to protest what he considered its distancing itself from Quakers. He penned the widely circulated "There is a Spirit", a series of sonnets he wrote in 1945 based on the last statement of the 17th century Quaker James Nayler.

== Work ==
Boulding was widely recognized in academia as a prolific writer and an integrator of knowledge. For Boulding, economics and sociology were not social sciences— rather, they were all aspects of a single social science devoted to the study of human persons and their relationships (organizations). Boulding spearheaded an evolutionary (instead of equilibrium) approach to economics.

Boulding emphasized that human economic and other behavior is embedded in a larger interconnected system. To understand the results of our behavior, economic or otherwise, we must first research and develop a scientific understanding of the ecodynamics of the general system, the global society in which we live, in all its dimensions spiritual and material. Boulding believed that in the absence of a committed effort to the right kind of social science research and understanding, the human species might well be doomed to human extinction. But he was optimistic, believing our evolutionary journey had just begun.

=== Economic Analysis, 1941 ===
Boulding's first major work in economics was his introductory textbook, entitled Economic Analysis. It was written when he was an instructor at Colgate University in the late-1930s and first appeared in 1941 from Harper & Brothers in single-volume and two-volume editions. The book was augmented and republished in four editions, the last in 1966. In a 1942 book review, Max Millikan pointed out that the book was published at the right time and the right place. According to Millikan:

For some years there has been a yawning gap in the literature of economic theory between the very elementary text designed for beginning students and the clutter of specialized monographs and periodical articles accessible only to the fully trained economist. The teacher attempting to lead his charges over this difficult and dangerous terrain has had to choose between two unsatisfactory alternatives. He could devote all his time to formal lecturing about a subject that requires informal discussion and problems for its proper comprehension; or he could assign and discuss a hodgepodge of advanced books and articles in the hope, usually vain, that some fraction of the class would struggle through to a comprehension of some fraction of the material.

Millikan concluded that Boulding's work had filled the gap "neatly and effectively... material is organized by tools of analysis and the problems in the solution of which those tools are useful rather than in the conventional manner". In the preface Boulding had explained that the book was "intended as a text from which the student can learn and the teacher can teach the methods and results of economic analysis. It also seeks to be a contribution to the development and systematization of the body of economic analysis itself."

Looking back in 1989, Boulding explained, that "the first edition fundamentally followed Irving Fisher and Keynes's Treatise on Money. Even though I had read Keynes's General Theory by that time, I think I had not really understood it. I am not quite sure that I do now. The second edition, however, in 1948, was a thoroughly Keynesian general theory." The first edition was published at the outbreak of World War II and did not sell well, but the second revised edition did and became "one of the core textbooks used in college in the United States (and eventually around the world)."

=== Evolutionary economics ===
Boulding was an exponent of the evolutionary economics movement. In his "Economic Development as an Evolutionary System" (1961, 1964), Boulding suggests a parallel between economic development and biological evolution.

=== Agricultural economics ===
Boulding, who had no background in farming, was involved in agricultural economics for at least 3 decades. Boulding stated in "Agricultural Organizations and Policies: A Personal Evaluation" (1962), which nevertheless was published as a national policy program for US agriculture by the influential Committee for economic development:

The dilemma is, however, that if you are to get resources out of any occupation, you have to squeeze it. The only way I know to get toothpaste out of a tube is to squeeze, and the only way to get people out of agriculture is likewise to squeeze agriculture. If the toothpaste is thin, you don’t squeeze very hard. On the other hand, if the toothpaste is thick, you have to put real pressure on it. If you can’t get people out of agriculture easily, you are going to have to do farmers severe injustice in order to solve the problem of allocation.

Boulding argued to abolish the USDA because he felt it was a special interest group for an industry that did not need one.

=== The Economics of the Coming Spaceship Earth, 1966 ===
Following the publication of Rachel Carson's Silent Spring in 1962, the developing environmental movement drew attention to the relationship between economic growth and development and environmental degradation. Boulding in his influential 1966 essay "The Economics of the Coming Spaceship Earth" identified the need for the economic system to fit itself to the ecological system with its limited pools of resources. He advised to see earth´s ecosystem best represented as a stock of assets.

== Publications ==
Boulding published some thirty books and more than eight hundred articles.

=== Books ===
1940s to 1960s

- 1941, Economic Analysis, Harper & Brothers; 3rd single edition, 1955;4th ed. part II, 1966
- 1942, A Peace Study Outline: The Practice of the Love of God, Philadelphia Yearly Meeting Book Committee
- 1945, The Economics of Peace, Prentice Hall.
- 1945, There is a Spirit: The Nayler Sonnets, Fellowship Publications.
- 1950, A Reconstruction of Economics, J. Wiley.
- 1953, The Organizational Revolution: A Study in the Ethics of Economic Organization, Harper & Brothers.
- 1956, The Image: Knowledge in Life and Society, University of Michigan Press.
- 1958, The Skills of the Economist, Cleveland: Howard Allen.
- 1958, Principles of Economic Policy, Prentice-Hall, 1958.
- 1962, Conflict and Defence: A General Theory, Harper & Bros.
- 1964, The Meaning of the Twentieth Century: the Great Transition, Harper & Row.
- 1966 The Impact of the Social Sciences, Rutgers University Press
- 1966, "The Economics of Knowledge and the Knowledge of Economics". American Economic Review, Vol. 56, No. 1/2, March 1, 1966: 1–13
- 1968, Beyond Economics: Essays on Society, Religion, and Ethics, (University of Michigan Press)
- 1969, "The Grants Economy", Michigan Academician (Winter)

1970s

- 1970, Economics as a Science, (McGraw-Hill, 1970).
- 1970, A Primer on Social Dynamics: History as Dialectics and Development, (Free Press, 1970).
- 1971, Economics, Colorado Associated University Press, 1971.
- 1973, Political Economy, Colorado Associated University Press, 1973.
- 1973, The Economy of Love and Fear: A Preface to Grants Economics, Wadsworth.
- 1974, Toward a General Social Science, Colorado Associated University Press.
- 1975, International Systems: Peace, Conflict Resolution, and Politics, Colorado Associated University Press.
- 1975, Sonnets from the Interior Life, and Other Autobiographical Verse, Colorado Associated University Press.
- 1978, Stable Peace, University of Texas Press.
- 1978, Ecodynamics: A New Theory of Societal Evolution, Sage.

1980s to 1993

- 1980, Beasts, Ballads, and Bouldingisms: A Collection of Writings, Transaction Books.
- 1981, Evolutionary Economics, London: Sage.
- 1981, A Preface to Grants Economics: The Economy of Love and Fear. New York: Praeger.
- 1985, Toward the Twenty-First Century: Political Economy, Social Systems, and World Peace, Colorado Associated University Press.
- 1985, Human Betterment, Sage.
- 1985, The World as a Total System, Sage.
- 1986, Mending the World: Quaker Insights on the Social Order, Pendle Hill Publications.
- 1989, Three Faces of Power, Sage.
- 1992, Towards a New Economics: Critical Essays on Ecology, Distribution, and Other Themes, Edward Elgar.
- 1993, The Structure of a Modern Economy: the United States, 1929–1989, Macmillan.

=== Selected articles ===
Some of his most cited works:

- Boulding, Kenneth E. "General systems theory—the skeleton of science". Management Science 2.3 (1956): 197–208; Online at panarchy.org, 2000–2017.
- Boulding, Kenneth E. "National images and international systems", Journal of Conflict Resolution 3.2 (1959): 120–131.
- An Adaptive Plan for Agriculture (PDF). 1962. p. 157. Archived (PDF) from the original on 2021-03-08.
- Boulding, Kenneth E. "The economics of the coming spaceship earth", Environmental Quality Issues in a Growing Economy (1966).
- Boulding, Kenneth E. "Economics as a moral science", The American Economic Review 59.1 (1969): 1–12.
- Boulding, Kenneth E. "Evolutionary economics", Journal of Business Ethics 2 (2):160–162 (1983).

== See also ==
- Holism in science
- Loss of Strength Gradient
- Spaceship Earth
