= Sucker Bait =

Short story by Isaac Asimov

- Author: Isaac Asimov
- Language: English
- Series: Troas
- Genre: Science fiction
- Published in: Astounding Science Fiction
- Publisher: Street & Smith
- Publication date: February/March 1954
- Publication place: United States
- Media type: Periodical
- Followed by: Question and Answer

Sucker Bait is a science fiction novella by American writer Isaac Asimov. It was first serialized in the February and March 1954 issues of Astounding Science Fiction, and reprinted in the 1955 collection The Martian Way and Other Stories. It has also been adapted as an episode of the BBC anthology television series Out of the Unknown.

== Origins ==
Asimov was approached in 1953 by the editor Fletcher Pratt, of Twayne Press, with a story proposal: a scientist would create a world, and then Asimov, Poul Anderson, and Virginia Kidd (although Anderson stated that the third writer was Kidd's husband, James Blish) would write novellas set in that world.

The three novellas would then be published as a book, together with an essay by the scientist who created the planet. This formula, which Pratt called a "Twayne Triplet", had already resulted in the book The Petrified Planet in 1952.

The scenario created was that of a binary star system in the globular cluster, Messier 13, with an Earthlike planet called Troas (or more informally, "Junior") located at one of the system's Lagrangian points. An earlier expedition to Troas for colonization had suffered some mysterious disaster, and a second expedition is being sent to find out if "Junior" was suitable for colonization, and to find out what happened to the first expedition.

Asimov finished his short story, and then Anderson finished a story called "Question and Answer", but Kidd (or James Blish) never completed the third story. The proposed book was never printed. Asimov anticipated that just such a thing might happen, and he arranged that he held the first serial rights for his story. He sold "Sucker Bait" to Astounding Magazine, where it appeared just a few months before "Question and Answer".

== Plot summary ==
The story concerns the starship George G. Grundy, or Triple G., which has been chartered by the "Confederacy of Worlds" to investigate "Junior". The only nonscientist among the passengers of the Triple G. is 20-year-old Mark Annuncio of the "Mnemonic Service", who has been trained from the age of five to memorize and correlate vast amounts of information.

Over a century earlier, an attempt to colonize Junior had failed. After nearly two years on the planet, all 1,337 colonists had died for reasons unknown. The scientists of the Triple G. and Annuncio have the mission to find out what killed them. For the first two weeks after landing, everyone remains aboard while the scientists take readings. After the expedition's microbiologist Rodriguez declares that the local life forms are noninfectious, Annuncio and a handful of scientists travel to the original site of the colony.

Relations between the scientists and Annuncio deteriorate rapidly. The Mnemonics are loners by nature, and their training makes them even more so. The mere mention of a word such as "albedo" causes Annuncio to mentally see a parade of planetary albedo numbers in his mind, inhibiting his ability to process conversation. The scientists, on the other hand, as specialists, tend to be contemptuous of a professional generalist like Annuncio. When Annuncio asks Rodriguez to explain how he came to a conclusion, the microbiologist regards the request as an affront to his professional reputation, and refuses to answer. The other scientists manage to offend Annuncio in various ways, as well.

When Annuncio finally realizes that the abnormally high concentration of beryllium in the soil and plants of Junior was what killed the colonists, and that they all have to leave immediately, he does not trust the scientists to deal with it. He returns to the ship and persuades the crew to mutiny and take off from the planet. The captain is barely able to convince the crew to stop at the colony site to pick up the scientists. When Annuncio is put on trial for fomenting the mutiny, he explains his actions, is acquitted, and the ship returns to the Earth to seek medical treatment for its crew for beryllium poisoning.

== Reception ==
Anthony Boucher praised the novella, commending its balance of science and fiction "worthy of that Golden Age in which Asimov began his career."

== Themes ==
Like other short stories by Asimov such as The Dead Past and Profession, the theme of Sucker Bait is the peril of scientific overspecialization. Only Annuncio, the professional generalist, can make the connections between seemingly unrelated facts that solves the mystery of the deaths of the original colonists, and he saves the crew and passengers of the Triple G. from sharing that fate. Asimov would soon begin to practice what he preached, making himself into a professional generalist by writing popular science books on a number of different fields, as well as The Intelligent Man's Guide to Science, a general overview of science as a whole.

== Story notes ==
- This is the longest of Isaac Asimov's novellas.
- Although the two primaries of "Junior" are named Lagrange I and II in the story, the proper astronomical nomenclature would be Lagrange A and B.
- "Sucker Bait" mentions several fictional planets, including some from other stories: Troas (Junior), Coralemon, Aurora, Sarmatia, Coma Minor, Hesperus, Pretoria, Altmark, and Lepta.
- Some "80,000 worlds" are mentioned as having been colonized by the future time-period in which the story is set.
- This novella was stated by Asimov (in 1955) to have been set in his Foundation universe, although some slight inconsistencies exist with the political status and physical condition of the Earth by the time frame of the tale—with no mention being made of the Earth's ever-increasing radioactivity (though this was retconned to be a very, very gradual process, and not the result of a nuclear war c. 10,000 A.D., and the Earth still appears to be the center of the human race in general). This, however, was an early version of the timeline, inconsistent with Asimov's "Robot" tales.
- At one point, a scientist states that a computer cannot do what the Mnemonic Service does, since even if there is a computer that knows all the required data, no one will know to ask the right question. A similar theme is present in the short story "Jokester,” which it is stated that such people (so called Grand Masters), capable of finding the right questions to ask the all-knowing Multivac do exist, but are extremely rare, only born about once a decade.
- An illustration in the issue of Astounding magazine in which the first part of this novella appeared features a chemistry-based wordplay. It shows a group of people gathered before a promotion-of-emigration poster reading "Be On Troas!" Though this is apparently an invitation to emigrate, it is also a slight give-away of the story's solution: "Be" is the chemical symbol for beryllium.
