= The Best Science Fiction of Isaac Asimov =

First edition (publ. Doubleday) Cover art by Robert Aulicino

The Best Science Fiction of Isaac Asimov, published in 1986, is a collection of 28 short stories by American writer Isaac Asimov, personally selected as favorites by himself.

== Content ==
- "All the Troubles of the World"
- "A Loint of Paw"
- "The Dead Past"
- "Death of a Foy"
- "Dreaming Is a Private Thing"
- "Dreamworld"
- "Eyes Do More Than See"
- "The Feeling of Power"
- "Flies"
- "Found!"
- "The Foundation of S.F. Success"
- "Franchise"
- "The Fun They Had"
- "How It Happened"
- "I Just Make Them Up, See!"
- "I'm in Marsport Without Hilda"
- "The Immortal Bard"
- "It's Such a Beautiful Day"
- "Jokester"
- "The Last Answer"
- "The Last Question"
- "My Son, the Physicist"
- "Obituary"
- "Spell My Name with an S"
- "Strikebreaker"
- "Sure Thing"
- "The Ugly Little Boy"
- "Unto the Fourth Generation"

== Reception ==
Dave Langford reviewed The Best Science Fiction of Isaac Asimov for White Dwarf #88, and stated that "Some OK stuff here, but little that's unfamiliar."

== Reviews ==
- Review by Donald M. Hassler (1986) in Fantasy Review, October 1986
- Review by Jim England (1987) in Vector 137
- Review by Don D'Ammassa (1987) in Science Fiction Chronicle, #92 May 1987
- Review by Terry Broome (1988) in Paperback Inferno, #74
