= Question and Answer (novel) =

1954 science fiction novel by Poul Anderson

- Cover of the first edition.
- Author: Poul Anderson
- Cover artist: Ed Valigursky
- Language: English
- Series: Troas
- Genre: Science fiction
- Published: 1956 Ace Books
- Publication place: United States
- Media type: print (Paperback)
- Pages: 105
- Preceded by: Sucker Bait

Question and Answer is a science fiction novel by American writer Poul Anderson. It originally appeared in the June and July 1954 issues of magazine Astounding Science Fiction, and was later reprinted in 1956 as part of Ace Double D-199 under the title Planet of No Return, and again as a stand-alone Ace novel in February 1978 under the original title.

== Planet Troas ==
Anderson was approached in 1953 by Twayne Press editor Fletcher Pratt with a story proposal: a scientist would create a world, and then he, Isaac Asimov and James Blish (Asimov thought the third writer might have been Blish's then-wife, Virginia Kidd) would write novellas set in that world. The three novellas would then be published as a book, together with an essay by the scientist who created the scenario. This formula, which Pratt called a Twayne Triplet, had already resulted in the 1952 book The Petrified Planet.

The scenario created was that of a binary star system in the Messier 13 globular cluster with an Earthlike planet called Troas (or more informally, Junior) located at one of the system's Lagrangian points. An earlier expedition to Troas had suffered some mysterious disaster, and a second expedition was being mounted to determine if the planet was suitable for colonization, and to find out what happened to the first expedition.

Anderson finished his story, and Asimov finished a story called "Sucker Bait", but Blish (or Kidd) never completed the third story, and the proposed book never saw print. Anderson was able to sell Question and Answer to Astounding (where it appeared a few months after "Sucker Bait") and later to Ace Books.

== Plot summary ==
John Lorenzen is an astronomer from Lunopolis who is recruited by the Lagrange Institute for the second expedition to Troas. At this time, Earth is still recovering from a two-century-long era of war and chaos that began with the Soviet conquest of North America in World War III and ended with the unification of the Solar System at the conclusion of a war between Mars and Venus. Twenty-two years after the discovery of a faster-than-light drive, Troas is the only Earthlike world to be discovered, and enthusiasm for interstellar travel is waning. If Troas is not opened to colonization, humanity may give up interstellar travel altogether.

The effort to mount a second expedition to Troas is plagued with difficulties. The Lagrange Institute is unable to charter a starship and must build its own, the Henry Hudson. The construction of the Hudson is hampered by delays, cost overruns, and at least one act of outright sabotage. The voyage of the Hudson to Troas is also troubled, as tension rises among the members of the expedition. Edward Avery, the expedition's psychomed, is unable to maintain group harmony aboard the ship, and at least one fight breaks out.

Upon arrival at Troas, the crew of the Hudson find no trace of the first expedition. After it is determined that there are no harmful microorganisms on Troas, a base camp is established on the planet. Eighteen days later, a group of aliens appears. Avery is assigned to learn the aliens' language, and he reports that it is extremely difficult to understand. He is eventually able to determine that the aliens are called the Rorvan, and that they are native to Troas. This is bad news for the expedition, since planets with native intelligent species are off limits to colonization. The Rorvan invite a small group of humans, including Avery and Lorenzen, to accompany them to their settlement.

As the group of humans and Rorvan travel, Lorenzen listens to Avery's conversations with the aliens and realizes that their language is not nearly as difficult to understand as the psychomed claims. By the time they reach the Rorvan settlement, Lorenzen has learned through his eavesdropping that Avery and the Rorvan are conspiring to deceive the other humans. When Lorenzen finally confronts Avery, the psychomed admits that he and his clique within Earth's government have been deliberately stifling interstellar travel, since they feel that humanity is not ready for it. The members of the first expedition were interned after returning to the Solar System, and the Rorvan are not native to Troas after all. Avery pleads with Lorenzen to help him maintain the deception, but Lorenzen refuses. He wants humanity to expand into the galaxy.

== Psychotechnic League ==
Although "Question and Answer" is similar in background to the stories that make up Anderson's Psychotechnic League future history, Anderson himself did not include "Question and Answer" in a timeline of the Psychotechnic League stories that he created to accompany the novella "The Snows of Ganymede" in the Winter 1955 issue of Startling Stories, even though the story had already been published in Astounding by then. He also failed to mention any connection in his introduction to the 1978 Ace Books edition of the story.

Further, the outcome of World War III, as well as events in the centuries immediately following the war, is inconsistent between "Question and Answer" and the Psychotechnic League stories. In the book, as noted, the Soviet Union conquered North America and Europe fell into a centuries-long devastation and chaos; conversely, in the Psychotechnic League history, the Soviet Union was totally destroyed, the survivors of its population reduced to the condition of "howling cannibals", while Europe recovered from its war devastation within a single generation.

In "Question and Answer" there is no mention of the Psychotechnic Institute. (In "Marius" it is noted that psychotechnics was started by the Finnish Professor Valti – a staunch opponent of the Soviets, who had a major role in freeing Europe from their occupation; obviously, Valti's life and scientific career would be completely different in a history where the Soviet Union won the war).

In Psychotechnic League stories and books, psychotechnics stands for human peace and prosperity, for unification of Earth and afterwards of the entire Solar System – as against the forces of militarism, nationalism, political and religious extremism, which have caused World War III and might, if not stopped, cause "another war which humanity may not survive" (as described in "Marius"). On these terms, Anderson is obviously on the side of psychotechnics and the characters representing the author's point of view act accordingly.

In "Question and Answer", however, psychotechnics – having succeeded in establishing peace and stability – sets itself squarely against spaceward expansion, seeking to keep humanity within the protecting cocoon of the Solar System and prevent its spread throughout the Galaxy. With this at stake, Anderson (and the character representing his point of view) turns against psychotechnics and for galactic expansion. This is inevitable, given Anderson's staunch support and advocacy of space flight in all periods of his fiction and non-fiction writing.

The basic theme of the book is similar to that of Asimov's The End of Eternity – though this similarity becomes evident only towards the respective ends of both books. In both – one dealing with spaceflight and exploration and the other with time-travel - an organization of well-meaning meddlers interferes to "guide" and manipulate the course of human history, with the aim of promoting safety, security and stability, and with the price being to stifle spaceflight and galactic exploration and colonization. And in both, the protagonist finally decides to abort these efforts and opt for galactic expansion, even at the cost of instability and uncertainty.

== Sources ==
- Tuck, Donald H. (1974). The Encyclopedia of Science Fiction and Fantasy. Chicago: Advent. p. 9.
