= The Best of Isaac Asimov =

Collection of twelve short stories by Isaac Asimov published in 1973

First edition, published by Sphere in March 73, UK). Cover art by Patrick Woodroffe.

The Best of Isaac Asimov is a collection of twelve science fiction short stories by American writer Isaac Asimov, published by Sphere in 1973. It begins with a short introduction (six pages in the Doubleday hardcover edition) giving various details on the stories, such as how they came to be written, or what significance merits their inclusion in a "best of" collection, as well as some of Dr. Asimov's thoughts on a best of collection itself. The stories included are two of his early works, two of his late works (post-1960), and eight from the 1950s, which he refers to as his "golden decade" in the introduction. Except for the last story in the book, "Mirror Image", none of the stories are related to his Robot and Foundation series, while a few ("The Last Question", "The Dead Past", and "Anniversary") mention the Multivac computer.

== Contents ==
- Introduction
- "Marooned off Vesta" (1939)
- "Nightfall" (1941), novelette
- "C-Chute" (1951), novelette
- "The Martian Way" (1952), novelette
- "The Deep" (1952), novelette
- "The Fun They Had" (1951)
- "The Last Question" (1956), Multivac series
- "The Dead Past" (1956), novelette, Multivac series
- "The Dying Night" (1956), novelette, Wendell Urth series
- "Anniversary" (1959), Multivac series
- "The Billiard Ball" (1967), novelette
- "Mirror Image" (1972), Robot series #2.5
