= Super-Science Fiction =

1950s US science fiction magazine

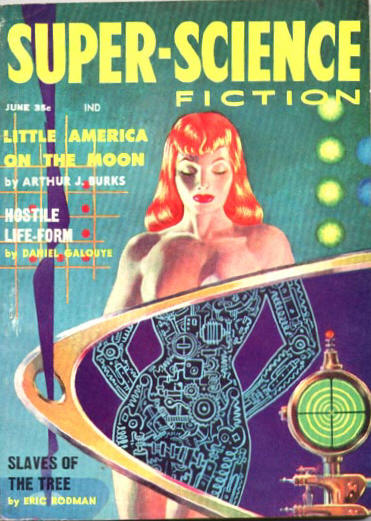
- Cover of the June 1958 issue; artwork by Kelly Freas
- First issue: December 1956; 68 years ago
- Final issue: October 1959
- Country: United States
- Language: English

Super-Science Fiction was an American digest science fiction magazine published from 1956 to 1959, edited by W. W. Scott and published by Feature Publications. Robert Silverberg and Harlan Ellison, who were at the start of their careers at the time, were already selling crime stories to Scott for his other magazines, Trapped and Guilty, and quickly started bringing Scott science fiction stories as well. Scott bought scores of stories from the pair during the magazine's short life; Silverberg in particular had at least one story in every single issue, and often two or three (and on one occasion, four). Much of the remainder was sent in by literary agents, and generally comprised material rejected by other magazines first, though Scott did obtain two stories from Isaac Asimov.

After a couple of years, Feature decided to switch the focus of the magazine to monster stories, hoping to cash in on the trend that was making Famous Monsters of Filmland a success at that time. Four more issues appeared, all the stories featuring a monster in some way, but Feature brought the axe down in 1959. The last issue was dated October that year. The magazine is not highly regarded by critics, though Silverberg considers the material he wrote for Scott and other action-adventure magazine publishers to have helped him learn his trade as a writer.

== Publication history ==
In 1940, Feature Publications began publishing Prize Comics, and followed this with other successful superhero titles, including Frankenstein Comics and Headline Comics. The Comics Code, introduced in 1954, forced Feature to stop publication of all three titles by late 1956. Two crime magazines took their place: Trapped, under their Headline imprint, and Guilty. Both were edited by William W. Scott, who had come over to Feature from Fiction House, which had gone out of business in 1955. (Note: In Robert Silverberg's reminiscences about the magazine he says Scott preferred to be called "Bill". He also says he thinks Scott had originally been a newspaperman before becoming a magazine editor.) Feature added Super-Science Fiction to Headline's list at the end of 1956, and gave it to Scott to edit, though he was not knowledgeable about the genre. According to Robert Silverberg's later recollection, the new magazine had been Scott's idea, and Scott had persuaded Feature to launch it. Scott paid two cents a word for both fiction and non-fiction, a rate that made the magazine competitive with the other major titles in the field.

Issues of Super-Science Fiction showing volume/issue number
Year	Jan	Feb	Mar	Apr	May	Jun	Jul	Aug	Sep	Oct	Nov	Dec
1956												1/1
1957		1/2		1/3		1/4		1/5		1/6		2/1
1958		2/2		2/3		2/4		2/5		2/6		3/1
1959		3/2		3/3		3/4		3/5		3/6		
W. W. Scott was editor throughout.

Science fiction magazines proliferated during the 1950s, with dozens of new titles launched during the decade, but by the end of the decade the market was moving away from fiction magazines and towards paperbacks. The popularity of TV and comics was another obstacle to success. Magazine distribution, which had to be reliable to support newsstand sales, was made far more difficult when a major distributor, American News Company, was liquidated in 1957. Super-Science Fiction was fortunate in having independent distribution, and so was able to avoid the worst effects of the change, but the disruption to the distribution business meant that smaller magazines could not always be reliably found on newsstands.

The late 1950s also saw an increase in public interest in science fiction monster movies, such as Godzilla, or Attack of the 50 Foot Woman, and a new magazine, Famous Monsters of Filmland, quickly became very successful. Other magazines, such as Monster Parade and Monsters and Things, tried to take advantage of the trend. Scott's response was to title the April 1959 issue of Super-Science Fiction a "Special Monster Issue", and to add a "Monster" banner to the cover of every subsequent issue. The move was a failure; only three more issues appeared before Feature Publications closed the magazine down. (Note: Silverberg heard the news about the closure in March 1959.) There have been no anthologies consisting solely of stories from the magazine, but in 2012 a collection of Robert Silverberg's stories, titled Tales from Super-Science Fiction, appeared, with an introduction in which Silverberg reminisced about his involvement with the magazine.

== Contents and reception ==
In 1956, Harlan Ellison was living in uptown Manhattan, in the same apartment building as Robert Silverberg and Randall Garrett. Early that year Ellison took Scott some stories that he had been unable to sell to Manhunt, a leading crime magazine, and Scott bought all of them for his crime titles, Trapped and Guilty. Silverberg and Ellison both began selling regularly to Scott, and that summer Scott let them know he had persuaded Feature Publications to add a science fiction title, which would pay the same high word rates as the crime magazines. By the end of June Silverberg had sold Scott "Catch 'Em All Alive", a short story that appeared in the first issue of Super-Science Fiction, as well as some short non-fiction material that Scott used to fill gaps at the bottom of pages in the magazine. Ellison also appeared in the first issue, with "Psycho at Mid-Point", as did Henry Slesar, whom Ellison had introduced to Scott. Scott's editorial in the first issue claimed that the magazine would focus on people: "The Man of The Future is going to conquer the universe with his fists and fury." Mike Ashley and Milton Subotsky, both science fiction historians, comment on the contradiction between the editorial and the contents of the first couple of issues, in many of which the protagonists fail, die, or go insane.

Both Silverberg and Ellison were producing work at high volume for the science fiction magazines active in the middle and late 1950s, and between them sold Scott nearly 40% of all the stories that appeared in the magazine. Silverberg also continued to sell Scott non-fiction filler material. Several literary agents, including Harry Altshuler and Scott Meredith, sent Scott material that had been rejected by other magazines, and Silverberg later recalled one occasion on which he visited Scott in his office to find him laughing over one of these manuscripts. The agency had accidentally sent the manuscript's submission history along with the story, showing that it had been rejected eighteen times, starting in 1947, before reaching Scott, who also rejected it. Ellison was drafted in 1957, but Silverberg's college exemption enabled him to continue writing for Scott, who eventually bought 36 stories from him, never rejecting a single submission. One exception to the rule that only rejected stories reached Scott was Isaac Asimov, who was turning to writing full-time, and was looking for new markets for his stories. Scott agreed to pay Asimov four cents a word, and bought two stories from him: "The Gentle Vultures", and "All the Troubles of the World", one of Asimov's stories about Multivac, a supercomputer. (Note: When the story appeared, Asimov was annoyed to discover that his name was mis-spelled "Issac" on the cover.) When the "Monster" banner was added to the cover, all stories had to have a monster appearing in them. Silverberg continued to produce stories for Scott to the end, providing twelve stories in the four monster-themed issues, all but one under a pseudonym.

At the time Silverberg was producing action-adventure work for Scott and other editors, he was also writing more sophisticated stories for other science fiction markets such as Galaxy and Astounding, but he considers the space-adventure material he wrote to have been helpful in training him as a writer, and fun, recalling that he had "always had a sneaky fondness for the pulpier side of science fiction ... when the chance came to write a slew of fast-paced action stories for W.W. Scott's Super-Science Fiction, I jumped for it eagerly." Silverberg's stories included titles such as "Creatures of Green Slime" and "Beasts of Nightmare Horror", but Ashley comments that Silverberg was too talented to write stories as bad as the titles suggested.

Ashley describes Scott's selections as "an appalling mixture", though he picks out two by Ellison, both in the second issue, as worthy of mention—"Mission: Hypnosis", and "The Untouchable Adolescents"—and also praises two other stories in the same issue: Charles de Vet's "Death of a Mutant", and James Gunn's "Every Day is Christmas". After that issue "the quality of the fiction dropped rapidly," according to Ashley, though he adds that "there were just enough good stories to make Super-Science Fiction always interesting, if often disappointing," picking out "Worlds of Origin", by Jack Vance, from his "Magnus Ridolph" series, and Asimov's "All the Troubles of the World" as highlights. In Subotsky's words, Scott was "unable to tell good fiction from bad", and the result was a magazine described by critic Brian Stableford as "mediocre". Ashley suggests that the magazine's late focus on monster stories might be of interest to fans of monster movies, but that otherwise it was "one magazine too many, coming in the final wave of interest in science fiction magazines at the end of the 1950s at a time when readers were already turning to the paperback".

== Bibliographic details ==
The magazine was published by Feature Publications under its Headline imprint, and was edited by W. W. Scott for all eighteen issues. The first issue was dated December 1956; it was bimonthly, and ended with the October 1959 issue. The volume numbering was completely regular, with three volumes of six numbers each.

== Sources ==
- Ashley, Michael (1977). The History of the Science Fiction Magazine: Vol. 3 1946–1955. Chicago: Contemporary Books Inc. ISBN 0-8092-7842-1.
- Ashley, Michael (1978). The History of the Science Fiction Magazine: Part 4 1956–1965. London: New English Library. ISBN 0-450-03438-0.
- Ashley, Mike (2005). Transformations: The Story of the Science-Fiction Magazines from 1950 to 1970. Liverpool: Liverpool University Press. ISBN 978-0-85323-779-2.
- Asimov, Isaac (1979). In Memory Yet Green: The Autobiography of Isaac Asimov, 1920–1954. New York: Doubleday. ISBN 978-0385136792.
- Asimov, Isaac (1980). In Joy Still Felt: The Autobiography of Isaac Asimov, 1954–1978. New York: Doubleday. OCLC 460687107.
- Silverberg, Robert (2012). Tales from Super-Science Fiction. Royal Oak, Michigan: Haffner Press. ISBN 978-1-893887-48-0.
- Stableford, Brian (1981) [1979]. "Super-Science Fiction". In Nicholls, Peter (ed.). The Encyclopedia of Science Fiction. St. Albans, UK: Granada. p. 585. ISBN 0-586-05380-8.
- Subotsky, Milton (1985). "Super-Science Fiction". In Tymn, Marshall B.; Ashley, Mike (eds.). Science Fiction, Fantasy and Weird Fiction Magazines. Westport, Connecticut: Greenwood Press. pp. 629–31. ISBN 0-313-21221-X.
