= The Life and Times of Multivac =

- Short story by Isaac Asimov
- Country: United States
- Language: English
- Genre: Science fiction

Publication
- Published in: The New York Times Magazine
- Publication type: Periodical
- Media type: Print (Magazine, Hardback & Paperback)
- Publication date: 5 January 1975

Chronology
- Series: Multivac
Key Item	Point of View

"The Life and Times of Multivac" is a science fiction short story by American writer Isaac Asimov. The story first appeared in the 5 January 1975 issue of The New York Times Magazine, and was reprinted in the collections The Bicentennial Man and Other Stories and The Best of Creative Computing in 1976. It is one of a loosely connected series of stories concerning a fictional supercomputer called Multivac. "The Life and Times of Multivac" was the first piece of fiction ever commissioned and published by The New York Times.

Asimov's original title for the story was "Mathematical Games", but after the story appeared under the new title he decided he liked it. In his commentary on the story in The Bicentennial Man and Other Stories collection, Asimov stated, "More people came up to me over the next few weeks to tell me they had read that story than had ever been the case for any other story I had ever written."

== Plot summary ==
When humanity begins to chafe under Multivac’s benevolent tyranny, one man takes matters into his own hands to destroy the great computer. By appearing to betray his fellow humans, he places himself in a position to permanently destroy Multivac. It is implied that it is not until completion of the act that he and his peers suddenly realize the enormity of their actions and the consequences it will have on humanity.
