= Anniversary (short story) =

- Short story by Isaac Asimov
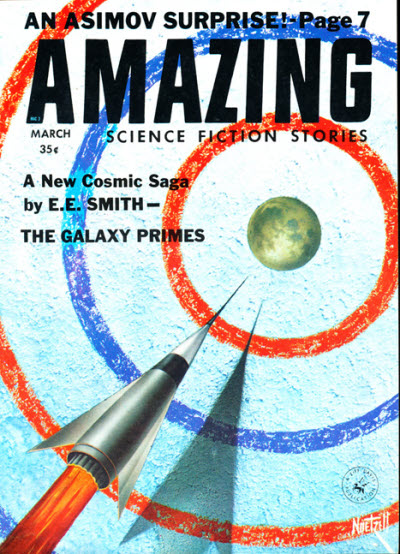
- Country: United States
- Language: English
- Genre: Science fiction

Publication
- Published in: Amazing Stories
- Publisher: Ziff-Davis
- Media type: Magazine
- Publication date: March 1959

Chronology
- Series: Silver Queen, Multivac
Marooned off Vesta, All the Troubles of the World	The Machine that Won the War

"Anniversary" is a science fiction short story by American writer Isaac Asimov. It was first published in the March 1959 issue of Amazing Stories and subsequently appeared in the collections Asimov's Mysteries (1968) and The Best of Isaac Asimov (1973).

The story was written for the twentieth anniversary of Asimov's first published story, "Marooned off Vesta", in the March 1939 issue of Amazing. The magazine reprinted the earlier story with the new one, and he feared that someone would write a letter stating that the earlier writing was better, but no one did. The story is also part of a loosely connected series of stories by Asimov about the supercomputer Multivac.

== Plot summary ==
Warren Moore and Mark Brandon are two of the three survivors of the wreck of the Silver Queen in the asteroid belt. Every year, they meet on the anniversary of the disaster to celebrate their survival. On the 20th anniversary, Brandon has a surprise: he appears at Moore's house with Michael Shea, the third survivor.

As the three men reminisce, Brandon admits that he is unhappy with the way their fame has faded over the years. Even though the three are still the only people ever to survive a spaceship wreck, the public has forgotten them. The only thing the general public remember about the wreck of the Silver Queen is that Dr. Horace Quentin, a great scientist, was killed.

When Shea mentions that Trans-space Insurance is still searching for wreckage from the ship, 20 years later, it occurs to Brandon that there must have been something extremely valuable on board, and that Trans-space still hasn't found it. The three men learn via Moore's Multivac terminal that Quentin had a prototype of a revolutionary new invention with him on the ship, and that it is still missing. The only clue is the description of the device as "an opticon", an apparent reference to a light-manipulating device.

Moore realizes that he has had the device all along, having idly picked it up as a souvenir during his spacewalk, and that its actual name is "anopticon", meaning a device without lenses. An apparently useless tube a few inches long, it seems to employ force-fields instead of conventional optics and can be used as a powerful microscope or telescope. The potential applications of the technology could be even broader. With Quentin's device in their possession, the three men will once again become famous.

In the first story, the irony was that the men were in orbit around Vesta with no source of motive power and limited food and air but a year's supply of water. They find a way to use the water as a makeshift rocket in order to reach Vesta, and on the way down they make a toast: "Here's to the year's supply of water we used to have." At the end of this story, they change the toast to "Here's to the Silver Queen souvenirs we used to have."

== Story notes ==
Asimov notes in his comments on the story that Moore picking up the device had been a throwaway line he included in the original "Marooned Off Vesta".
