= Nine Tomorrows =

Collection of writings by Isaac Asimov

- Dust-jacket from the first edition
- Author: Isaac Asimov
- Cover artist: Richard M. Powers
- Language: English
- Genre: Science fiction
- Publisher: Doubleday
- Publication date: 1959
- Publication place: United States
- Media type: Print (hardback)
- Pages: 236

Nine Tomorrows is a collection of nine short stories and two pieces of comic verse by American writer Isaac Asimov. The pieces were all originally published in magazines between 1956 and 1958, with the exception of the closing poem, "Rejection Slips", which was original to the collection. The book was first published in the United States in 1959 and in the UK in 1963. It includes two of Asimov's favorite stories, "The Last Question" and "The Ugly Little Boy".

Nine Tomorrows has been reprinted several times. The most recent publication appears to be a 1987 Del Rey reissue; ISBN 0-345-34604-1.

== Contents ==
- "I Just Make Them Up, See!", poem
- "Profession", novella
- "The Feeling of Power"
- "The Dying Night", novelette, part of the Wendell Urth series
- "I'm in Marsport Without Hilda"
- "The Gentle Vultures"
- "All the Troubles of the World", part of the Multivac series
- "Spell My Name with an S"
- "The Last Question", loosely part of the Multivac series
- "The Ugly Little Boy", novelette
- "Rejection Slips", poem

== Reception ==
Floyd C. Gale rated the collection four+ stars out of five, writing that "few other authors can claim [Asimov's] consistently high level of excellence" and mentioning "Profession" and "The Ugly Little Boy" as especially good.

== Sources ==
- Tuck, Donald H. (1974). The Encyclopedia of Science Fiction and Fantasy. Chicago: Advent. p. 22. ISBN 0-911682-20-1.
