= Robot Dreams (short story collection) =

Collection of science fiction short stories by Isaac Asimov

- First edition
- Author: Isaac Asimov
- Cover artist: Ralph McQuarrie
- Language: English
- Series: Robot series
- Genre: Science fiction
- Publisher: Berkley
- Publication date: November 1986
- Publication place: United States
- Media type: Print
- Pages: 349
- ISBN: 978-0-425-09345-0
- Preceded by: The Complete Robot
- Followed by: Robot Visions

Robot Dreams (1986) is a collection of science fiction short stories by American writer Isaac Asimov, illustrated by Ralph McQuarrie. The title story is about Susan Calvin's discovery of a robot with rather disturbing dreams. It was written specifically for this volume and inspired by the McQuarrie cover illustration. All of the other stories had previously appeared in various other Asimov collections. Four of the stories are robot stories, while five are Multivac stories.

The companion book, which also showcases McQuarrie's illustrations (and includes Asimov essays in addition to short stories), is titled Robot Visions.

== Contents ==
It contains a foreword by Asimov as well as the following stories:

1. "Little Lost Robot" (1947), a Robot story
2. "Robot Dreams" (1986), a Robot story
3. "Breeds There a Man...?" (1951)
4. "Hostess" (1951)
5. "Sally" (1953), a Robot story
6. "Strikebreaker" (1957)
7. "The Machine that Won the War" (1961), a Multivac story
8. "Eyes Do More Than See" (1965)
9. "The Martian Way" (1952)
10. "Franchise" (1955), a Multivac story
11. "Jokester" (1956), a Multivac story
12. "The Last Question" (1956), a Multivac story
13. "Does a Bee Care?" (1957)
14. "Light Verse" (1973), a Robot story
15. "The Feeling of Power" (1958)
16. "Spell My Name with an S" (1958)
17. "The Ugly Little Boy" (1958)
18. "The Billiard Ball" (1967)
19. "True Love" (1977), a Multivac story
20. "The Last Answer" (1980)
21. "Lest We Remember" (1982)

== Reception ==
Dave Langford reviewed Robot Dreams for White Dwarf #90. He stated that "The title story is new and quite good; the rest is familiar Asimovian reprint material."

== Reviews ==
- Review by Don D'Ammassa (1987) in Science Fiction Chronicle, #89 February 1987
- Review by Nik Morton (1987) in Vector 138
- Review by David V. Barrett (1987) in Vector 138
- Review by Tom Easton (1987) in Analog Science Fiction/Science Fact, August 1987
- Review by L. J. Hurst (1988) in Paperback Inferno, #74
- Review by Ian Sales (1990) in Paperback Inferno, #82
- Review by Michael Tolley (1992) in SF Commentary, #71/72

Preceded by The Complete Robot	Robot series Foundation Series	Succeeded by Robot Visions
