= The Last Question =

1956 science-fiction short story by Isaac Asimov

- Short story by Isaac Asimov
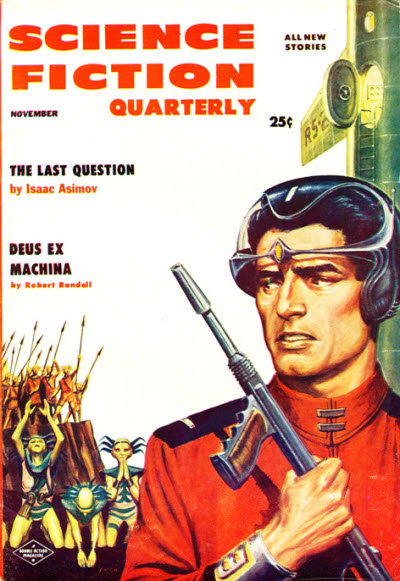
- Country: United States
- Language: English
- Genre: Science fiction

Publication
- Published in: Science Fiction Quarterly
- Publication type: Periodical
- Publisher: Columbia Publications
- Media type: Print (magazine, hardback & paperback)
- Publication date: November 1956

Chronology
- Series: Multivac
"Someday"	"Jokester"

"The Last Question" is a science fiction short story by American writer Isaac Asimov. It first appeared in the November 1956 issue of Science Fiction Quarterly; and in the anthologies in the collections Nine Tomorrows (1959), The Best of Isaac Asimov (1973), Robot Dreams (1986), The Best Science Fiction of Isaac Asimov (1986), the retrospective Opus 100 (1969), and Isaac Asimov: The Complete Stories, Vol. 1 (1990). While he also considered it one of his best works, "The Last Question" was Asimov's favorite short story of his own authorship, and is one of a loosely connected series of stories concerning a fictional computer called Multivac. Through successive generations, humanity questions Multivac on the subject of entropy.

The story blends science fiction, theology, and philosophy. It has been recognized as a counterpoint to Fredric Brown's short short story "Answer", published two years earlier.

== History ==
In conceiving Multivac, Asimov was extrapolating the trend towards centralization that characterized computation technology planning in the 1950s to an ultimate centrally managed global computer. After seeing a planetarium adaptation of his work, Asimov "privately" concluded that the story was his best science fiction yet written. He placed it just higher than "The Ugly Little Boy" (September 1958) and "The Bicentennial Man" (1976). The story asks the question of humanity's fate, and human existence as a whole, highlighting Asimov's focus on important aspects of our future like population growth and environmental issues.

"The Last Question" ranks with "Nightfall" (1941) as one of Asimov's best-known and most acclaimed short stories. He wrote in 1973 that he appreciated how easy the story was to write after he had the idea. He was so often approached by fans who remembered the story but not the title, that in one instance he answered the title, correctly, before the fan had even described the story.

== Plot summary ==
By the year 2061, Multivac, a self-adjusting and self-correcting computer, has allowed mankind to reach beyond the planetary confines of Earth and harness solar energy. Two technicians, Adell and Lupov, celebrate Multivac's role in this development. Over drinks, they discuss that the sun will expire due to the second law of thermodynamics, which states that entropy inevitably increases. When Adell asks Multivac whether this can be reversed, the computer responds that it has insufficient data to provide a meaningful answer.

In several episodes over ten trillion years, increasingly advanced humans pose the same question to the computers of their time. Each time the computer gives the same response. At the heat death of the universe, the last disembodied consciousness of Man asks the question a final time of a computer that resides in hyperspace before merging with it.

After collecting the last data from the dead universe, the computer continues to process it alone and finds an answer to the last question. Having no one to tell it to, it proceeds to demonstrate, saying "LET THERE BE LIGHT!"

== Themes ==
=== Philosophy ===
Although science and religion are frequently presented as having an oppositional relationship, "The Last Question" explores some Biblical contexts ("Let there be light"). In Asimov's story, aspects like the great meaning of existence are culminated through both technology and human knowledge. The evolution from Multivac to AC also emulates a sort of cycle of existence.

=== Dystopian happy ending ===
Multivac's purpose was conceptualized with a desire for knowledge, promoting the idea that more knowledge will lead to a better and more fruitful future for humanity. However, the computer's answers regarding the future suggest an inevitable exhaustion of the Sun, and this thirst for knowledge becomes an obsession with the future. The story's end displays a dichotomy between annihilation and peace.

== Dramatic adaptations ==
=== Planetarium shows ===
- "The Last Question" was first adapted for the Abrams Planetarium at Michigan State University (in 1966), featuring the voice of Leonard Nimoy, as Asimov wrote in his autobiography In Joy Still Felt (1980).
- It was adapted for the Strasenburgh Planetarium in Rochester, New York (in 1969), under the direction of Ian C. McLennan.
- It was adapted for the Edmonton Space Sciences Centre in Edmonton, Alberta (early 1970s), under the direction of John Hault.
- It was adapted for the Gates Planetarium at the Denver Museum of Natural History in 1973 under the direction of Mark B. Peterson

It subsequently played at the:

- Fels Planetarium of the Franklin Institute in Philadelphia in 1973
- Planetarium of the Reading School District in Reading, Pennsylvania in 1974
- Buhl Planetarium, Pittsburgh in 1974
- The Space Transit Planetarium of the Museum of Science in Miami during 1977
- Vanderbilt Planetarium in Centerport New York, in 1978, read by singer-songwriter and Long Island resident Harry Chapin.
- Hansen Planetarium in Salt Lake City, Utah (in 1980 and 1989)
- A reading of the story was played on BBC Radio 7 in 2008 and 2009.
- Gates Planetarium in Denver, Colorado (in early 2020)

In 1989 Asimov updated the star show adaptation to add in quasars and black holes.

The story was adapted as a comic book by Don Thompson and drawn by John Estes in the third issue of ORBiT.

== See also ==
- The Best of Isaac Asimov
- Cyclic model
- "The Last Answer"
- Shaggy God story
- Technological singularity
- 42 (answer)
