= Someday (short story) =

- Short story by Isaac Asimov
- Country: United States
- Language: English
- Genre: Science fiction

Publication
- Published in: Infinity Science Fiction
- Publication type: Periodical
- Publisher: Royal Publications
- Media type: Print (magazine)
- Publication date: August 1956

Chronology
- Series: Multivac
The Dead Past	The Last Question

"Someday" is a science fiction short story by American writer Isaac Asimov. It was first published in the August 1956 issue of Infinity Science Fiction and reprinted in the collections Earth Is Room Enough (1957), The Complete Robot (1982), Robot Visions (1990), and The Complete Stories, Volume 1 (1990).

== Plot summary ==
The story is set in a future where computers play a central role in organizing society. Humans are employed as computer operators, but they leave most of the thinking to machines. Indeed, whilst binary programming is taught at school, reading and writing have become obsolete.

The story concerns a pair of boys who dismantle and upgrade an old Bard, a child's computer whose sole function is to generate random fairy tales. The boys download a book about computers into the Bard's memory in an attempt to expand its vocabulary, but the Bard simply incorporates computers into its standard fairy tale repertoire. The story ends with the boys excitedly leaving the room after deciding to go to the library to learn "squiggles" (writing) as a means of passing secret messages to one another. As they leave, one of the boys accidentally kicks the Bard's on switch. The Bard begins reciting a new story about a poor mistreated and often ignored robot called the Bard, whose sole purpose is to tell stories, which ends with the words: "the little computer knew then that computers would always grow wiser and more powerful until someday—someday—someday—…"
