= Question (short story) =

- Short story by Isaac Asimov
- Country: United States
- Language: English
- Genre: Science fiction

Publication
- Published in: Computers and Automation
- Media type: Magazine
- Publication date: March 1955

Chronology
- Series: Multivac
—	Franchise

"Question" is a science fiction short story by American writer Isaac Asimov. The story first appeared in the March 1955 issue of Computers and Automation (thought to be the first computer magazine), and was reprinted in the April 30, 1957, issue of Science World. It is the first of a loosely connected series of stories concerning a fictional supercomputer called Multivac.

The story concerns two technicians who are servicing Multivac, and their argument over whether or not the machine is truly intelligent and able to think. Multivac, however, supplies the answer on its own.

After the reprint, another author, Robert Sherman Townes, noticed the climax in the last sentence was very similar to one of his own stories, "Problem for Emmy" (Startling Stories, June 1952), and wrote to Asimov about it. After searching in his library, Asimov did find the original story and, although he did not recall having read it, admitted that the endings were pretty similar. He then replied to Townes, apologizing and promising the story would never again be published, and it never was. Asimov mentioned "Question" in an editorial called "Plagiarism" which appeared in the August 1985 issue of Asimov's Science Fiction (although he did not mention Townes' name or the title of either story). "Plagiarism" was reprinted in Asimov's collection Gold (1995).

== Sources ==
- "Question" at AsimovReviews.net
