= The Martian Way and Other Stories =

1955 collection of stories by Isaac Asimov

- First edition
- Author: Isaac Asimov
- Cover artist: Richard Shelton
- Language: English
- Genre: Science fiction
- Publisher: Doubleday
- Publication date: 1955
- Publication place: United States
- Media type: Print (hardback)
- Pages: 222
- Preceded by: I, Robot
- Followed by: Earth Is Room Enough

The Martian Way and Other Stories is a 1955 collection of four science fiction stories (3 novelettes and one novella) by American writer Isaac Asimov, previously published in 1952 and 1954. Although single-author story collections generally sell poorly, The Martian Way and Other Stories did well enough that Doubleday science fiction editor Walter I. Bradbury was willing to publish a second collection, Earth Is Room Enough, in 1957.

== Contents ==
- "The Martian Way", novelette
- "Youth", novelette
- "The Deep", novelette
- "Sucker Bait", novella

== Reception ==
Groff Conklin praised the collection as "an excellent introduction to the style and to the imagination of one of science fiction's most important writers."

== Sources ==
- Tuck, Donald H. (1974). The Encyclopedia of Science Fiction and Fantasy. Chicago: Advent. p. 22. ISBN 0-911682-20-1.
