= Robot Visions =

1990 short story collection by Isaac Asimov

- First edition
- Author: Isaac Asimov
- Cover artist: Ralph McQuarrie
- Language: English
- Series: Robot series
- Genre: science fiction
- Publisher: Roc
- Publication date: 1990
- Publication place: United States
- Media type: print
- ISBN: 0-451-45000-0
- Preceded by: Robot Dreams
- Followed by: The Positronic Man

Robot Visions (1990) is a collection of science fiction short stories and factual essays by Isaac Asimov. Many of the stories are reprinted from other Asimov collections, particularly I, Robot and The Bicentennial Man and Other Stories. It also includes the title story, "Robot Visions" (written specifically for this collection), which combines Asimov's motifs of robots and of time travel. It is the companion book to Robot Dreams (1986).

== Contents ==
=== Introduction: The Robot Chronicles ===
This is an 18-page introductory essay by Asimov. It consists of 17 pages of text and a one-page illustration by Ralph McQuarrie; these are the page counts of the hardcover edition. This essay (minus the illustration) was later reprinted in Asimov's collection Gold.

=== Stories ===
Title	Year	First appeared
"Robot Visions"	1990	First appeared in this collection
"Too Bad!"	1989	First appeared in The Microverse
"Robbie"	1940	First appeared in Super Science Stories under the title "Strange Playfellow”
"Reason"	1941	First appeared in Astounding Science Fiction
"Liar!"	1941	First appeared in Astounding Science Fiction
"Runaround"	1942	First appeared in Astounding Science Fiction
"Evidence"	1946	First appeared in Astounding Science Fiction
"Little Lost Robot"	1947	First appeared in Astounding Science Fiction
"The Evitable Conflict"	1950	First appeared in Astounding Science Fiction
"Feminine Intuition"	1969	First appeared in The Magazine of Fantasy and Science Fiction
"The Bicentennial Man"	1976	First appeared in Stellar #2
"Someday"	1956	First appeared in Infinity Science Fiction
"Think!"	1977	First appeared in Isaac Asimov's Science Fiction Magazine
"Segregationist"	1967	First appeared in Abbotempo 4
"Mirror Image"	1972	First appeared in Analog: Science Fiction - Science Fact
"Lenny"	1958	First appeared in Infinity Science Fiction
"Galley Slave"	1957	First appeared in Astounding Science Fiction
"Christmas Without Rodney"	1988	First appeared in Isaac Asimov's Science Fiction Magazine

=== Essays ===
Title	Year	First appeared
"Robots I Have Known"	1954	First appeared in Computers and Automation, October 1954
"The New Teachers"	1976	First appeared in American Way magazine
"Whatever You Wish"	1977	First appeared in American Way magazine
"The Friends We Make"	1977	First appeared in American Way magazine
"Our Intelligent Tools"	1977	First appeared in American Way magazine
"The Machine and the Robot"	1978	
"The Laws of Robotics"	1979	First appeared in American Way magazine
"The New Profession"	1979	First appeared in American Way magazine
"The Robot As Enemy?"	1979	First appeared in American Way magazine
"Intelligences Together"	1979	First appeared in American Way magazine
"My Robots"	1987	First appeared in Isaac Asimov's Robot City — Book 1: Odyssey
"The Laws of Humanics"	1987	First appeared in Isaac Asimov's Robot City — Book 2: Suspicion
"Cybernetic Organism"	1987	First appeared in Isaac Asimov's Robot City — Book 3: Cyborg
"The Sense of Humor"	1988	First appeared in Isaac Asimov's Robot City — Book 4: Prodigy
"Robots in Combination"	1988	First appeared in Isaac Asimov's Robot City — Book 6: Perihelion
"Future Fantastic"	1989	First appeared in Special Reports magazine, Spring 1989

Preceded by Robot Dreams	Robot series Foundation Series	Succeeded by Gold
