= The Martian Way =

1952 novella by Isaac Asimov

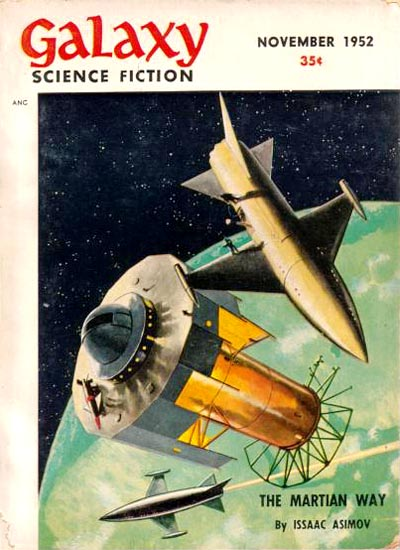
- Author: Isaac Asimov
- Language: English
- Genre: Science fiction
- Published in: Galaxy Science Fiction
- Publisher: Galaxy Publishing
- Publication date: November 1952
- Publication place: United States
- Media type: Print (Magazine, Hardback & Paperback)

The Martian Way is a science fiction novella by American writer Isaac Asimov. It was first published in the November 1952 issue of Galaxy Science Fiction and reprinted in the collections The Martian Way and Other Stories (1955), The Best of Isaac Asimov (1973), and Robot Dreams (1986). It was also included in The Science Fiction Hall of Fame, Volume Two (1973) after being voted one of the best novellas up to 1965.

There were originally no female characters in "The Martian Way", but Galaxy editor H. L. Gold insisted that one be included. Asimov complied by giving Richard Swenson a shrewish wife. It was not what Gold had in mind, but he accepted the story anyway.

When Asimov wrote "The Martian Way" in 1952, it was thought that the fragments making up Saturn's rings might be over a mile in diameter. It is now known that none of the ring fragments is more than a few meters in diameter.

The final journey back to Mars is described to be under constant acceleration (except for brief shutdowns for rest) which took five weeks, with the acceleration being well above the comfortable threshold for human beings. However, even with the maximum distance possible between Mars and Saturn, the constant acceleration and deceleration required to make such a journey in five weeks would have been below 1 m/s^{2}.

== Plot summary ==
Protagonists Mario Esteban Rioz and Ted Long are Scavengers: Mars-born humans who scour space for the spent lower stages of spacecraft, which are then recycled on the Martian moon Phobos. At the beginning of the story, Rioz scolds Long for wasting power listening to Grounder (Earth-born) politician John Hilder's argument that Earth's settlements on Mars, Venus, and the Moon are useless drains on Earth's economy, and that spaceships are wasting irreplaceable water by using it as reaction mass.

A year later, Hilder has used his campaign against "Wasters" to gain power in Earth's Assembly, and has just reduced shipments of water to Mars, putting the Scavengers out of work. When Hamish Sankov, the head of the Martian colony, learns of Hilder's plan to terminate all water shipments to Mars, he authorizes Long's plan to travel to Saturn and tow a fragment of ice from the rings to Mars.

A fleet of 25 Scavenger ships makes the trip. Reaching the rings, the Scavengers choose a fragment approximately one cubic mile in volume, carve it into a rough cylinder, embed their spaceships in it, and fly it back to Mars, using the fragment's ice as reaction mass, in five weeks.

On Mars, Hilder's allies are pressing Sankov to terminate all water exports to the Martian colony. When he hears from the returning Scavengers, Sankov signs. Two days later, the Scavengers land their ice-spacecraft in full view of the press, and Sankov announces that the fragment they brought holds 200 times the amount of water that Earth had been sending to Mars annually, and that if Earth cannot afford to lose any more water, the Martians will sell some of theirs. Long takes this situation as confirmation that Martians, instead of Terrestrials, shall colonize the remaining Solar System.

== Influence ==
The Martian Way was Asimov's response to the McCarthy Era and an early exploration of terraforming Mars. Asimov's distaste for the anti-Communist campaigns of McCarthy and the House Un-American Activities Committee was expressed in his portrayal of John Hilder's anti-Waster campaign. Asimov wrote in his autobiography that he expected to be either lionized or condemned for his attack on McCarthyism, but the story actually generated no reaction at all. He said elsewhere, "I must have been too subtle—or too unimportant."

The Martian Way of the title may be seen as an expression of the idea of manifest destiny. Asimov describes the vision of his character Ted Long for the Martians' future in terms of the frontier thesis of Frederick Jackson Turner and the idea of a "creative minority" expounded by Arnold Joseph Toynbee. The critic Joseph F. Patrouch has interpreted Asimov's choice of a mixture of Anglo-Saxon, Slavic, Latin and Scandinavian names (respectively, Ted Long, Hamish Sankov, Mario Rioz and Richard Swenson) for the Martian characters as a celebration of the melting pot of the American immigrant tradition. Also, Asimov's own claustrophilia informs his picture of the Martians, who can withstand isolation and lack of space much better than Earthborn humans.

Asimov was particularly proud of the story's prediction of the euphoria to be experienced by astronauts on spacewalks which were then still 15 years in the future.
