= Youth (Asimov short story) =

- Short story by Isaac Asimov

Text available at Wikisource
- Original title: Youth
- Language: English
- Genre: Science fiction novelette

Publication
- Published in: Space Science Fiction
- Publisher: Space Publications
- Media type: Magazine
- Publication date: May 1952

"Youth" is a science fiction novelette by Isaac Asimov. It first appeared in the May 1952 issue of Space Science Fiction and was reprinted in the 1955 collection The Martian Way and Other Stories. "Youth" is one of the rare Asimov stories with alien characters.

== Plot summary ==
Slim is a boy whose astronomer father is visiting the country estate of an important industrialist. The industrialist's son, Red, has found two strange animals, and he enlists Slim in a plan to turn the animals into a circus act. The astronomer, meanwhile, tells the industrialist that he has been in contact with space aliens who want to open up their world to interstellar trade. Their world needs help, the astronomer says; for ever since the atomic wars that destroyed their old civilization, their world has been regressing. Unless something is done, their civilization may face total collapse.

When they do not hear from the aliens, the astronomer and the industrialist go out looking for them. They find a small crashed spaceship with a number of tiny dead aliens in it, and the astronomer is convinced that the aliens all died in the crash. When he hears Red admit to the industrialist that he has been keeping two animals in a cage in a barn, he realizes that the "animals" are actually two surviving aliens. When the industrialist learns that the aliens allowed themselves to be captured and caged rather than harm the two youngsters, he is favorably impressed and agrees to help the aliens begin trading with his people. The two aliens succeed in repairing their spaceship and set out for their world: Earth.

Necessary for the narrative twist at the end, none of the characters in Youth have proper given names, and identifiable physical descriptions only appear toward the conclusion. All the adults, including the two aliens, are known by their professions, and the two youngsters are known by their nicknames.
