= True Love (short story) =

1977 science fiction story by Isaac Asimov

"True Love" is a science fiction short story by American writer Isaac Asimov. It was first published in the February 1977 issue of American Way magazine and reprinted in the collections The Complete Robot (1982) and Robot Dreams (1986).

In his autobiography In Joy Still Felt, the author states that American Way had requested a Valentine's Day story from him for its February 1977 issue, and that he wrote the story to console himself after the departure of his daughter following a visit during the 1976 Thanksgiving weekend.

== Plot summary ==
Milton Davidson is trying to find his ideal partner. To do this, he prepares a special computer program to run on Multivac, which he calls Joe, which has access to databases covering the entire populace of the world. He hopes that Joe will find him his ideal match, based on physical parameters as supplied.

Milton arranges to have the shortlisted candidates assigned to work with him for short periods, but realises that looks alone are not enough to find an ideal match. In order to correlate personalities, he speaks at great length to Joe, gradually filling Joe's databanks with information about his personality.

In doing so, Joe develops the personality of Milton. Upon finding an ideal match, he arranges to have Milton arrested for malfeasance, so that Joe can 'have the girl' for himself.
