= Ralph McQuarrie =

American concept artist and illustrator (1929–2012)

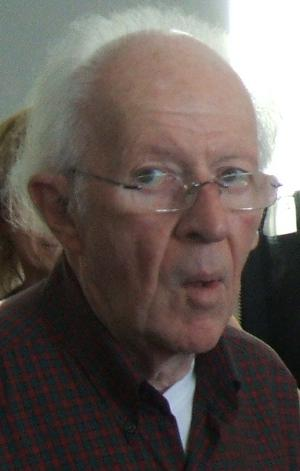
- McQuarrie visiting ILM in 2008
- Born: June 13, 1929; Gary, Indiana, U.S.
- Died: March 3, 2012 (aged 82); Berkeley, California, U.S.
- Education: Art Center College of Design
- Occupations: Illustrator, designer
- Notable work: Star Wars; E.T. the Extra-Terrestrial; Cocoon; Robot Dreams & Robot Visions
- Spouse: Joan Benjamin (m. 1983)
- Awards: Academy Award for Best Visual Effects (1985)
- Website: www.ralphmcquarrie.com

Ralph Angus McQuarrie (/məˈkwɒriː/; June 13, 1929 – March 3, 2012) was an American concept artist who worked in film and television. His career included work on the original Star Wars trilogy, the original Battlestar Galactica television series, the film E.T. the Extra-Terrestrial, and the film Cocoon, for which he won an Academy Award.

== Early life ==
Ralph McQuarrie was born on June 13, 1929, in Gary, Indiana, and was raised on a farm near Billings, Montana. He served in the United States Army during the Korean War, surviving a shot to the head. After returning from the war, McQuarrie moved to California in the 1960s, studying at the Art Center School, then in downtown Los Angeles.

== Career ==
McQuarrie initially worked for a dentistry firm, illustrating teeth and equipment, before working as an Artist and Preliminary Design Illustrator for the Boeing Company, where he drew diagrams for a manual on constructing the 747 Jumbo Jet, as well as designing film posters and animating CBS News' coverage of the Apollo space program at the three-man company Reel Three. While there, McQuarrie was asked by Hal Barwood to produce some illustrations for a film project he and Matthew Robbins were starting.

=== Star Wars ===
I just did my best to depict what I thought the film should look like, I really liked the idea. I didn't think the film would ever get made. My impression was it was too expensive. There wouldn't be enough of an audience. It's just too complicated. But George knew a lot of things that I didn't know.

— McQuarrie on Star Wars.

The young filmmaker George Lucas was impressed by McQuarrie's work and met with him to discuss his plans for a space-fantasy film, Star Wars. Lucas sought visual reference material to support his pitch to film studios and purchased pieces of science fiction artwork by John Berkey. In 1975, Lucas commissioned McQuarrie to illustrate several scenes from the script of the film. McQuarrie may have been inspired by some of Berkey's works, in particular a painting of a rocket-plane diving down through space towards a gigantic mechanical planet (the image had been used as cover art for the 1972 reprint of the short story anthology Star Science Fiction Stories No.4).

McQuarrie's concept paintings were instrumental in helping Lucas to win approval from 20th Century Fox; armed with vivid illustrations of his planned movie, Lucas was able to convince Fox executives to take a gamble and fund his Star Wars project. Despite their scepticism, it became a huge success upon release in 1977. Among McQuarrie's Star Wars portfolio were concept paintings depicting scenes on the planet Tatooine, inside the Mos Eisley cantina, inside the Death Star and on the moon of Yavin. During filming, Lucas ensured that many shots reproduced McQuarrie's paintings exactly, such was his esteem for McQuarrie's work. McQuarrie has said of his work on Star Wars, "I thought I had the best job that an artist ever had on a film, and I had never worked on a feature film before. ... I still get fan mail — people wondering if I worked on Episode I or just wanting to have my autograph."

McQuarrie designed many of the film's characters, including Darth Vader, Chewbacca, R2-D2 and C-3PO and drew many concepts for the film's sets. His production painting of R2-D2 and C-3PO wandering in the desert on the planet Tatooine was the first to be completed. His early concept for C-3PO was visibly inspired by the Art Deco Maschinenmensch robot from Fritz Lang's 1927 film Metropolis. The painting had a particular impact on actor Anthony Daniels, who was about to turn down the part of C-3PO: "He had painted a face and a figure that had a very wistful, rather yearning, rather bereft quality, which I found very appealing," said Daniels, and the appeal of McQuarrie's image convinced him to accept the role.

At Lucas' suggestion, McQuarrie designed a breathing apparatus for Darth Vader to wear. In an interview with Star Wars Insider Magazine, McQuarrie said that Lucas' artistic direction was to portray a malevolent figure in a cape with samurai armour. "For Darth Vader, George [Lucas] just said he would like to have a very tall, dark fluttering figure that had a spooky feeling like it came in on the wind." McQuarrie noted that the script indicated that Vader would travel between spaceships and needed to survive in the vacuum of space, and he proposed that Vader should wear some sort of space suit. Lucas agreed, and McQuarrie combined a full-face breathing mask with a samurai helmet, thus creating one of the most iconic designs of space fantasy cinema. A 1975 production painting of Darth Vader engaged in a lightsaber duel with Deak Starkiller (a character prototype for Luke Skywalker) depicts Vader wearing black armour, a flowing cape and an elongated, skull-like mask and helmet. Its similarity to the final design of Vader's costume demonstrates that McQuarrie's earliest conception of Vader was so successful that very little needed to be changed for production. Working from McQuarrie's artwork, the costume designer John Mollo devised a costume that could be worn by an actor on-screen using a combination of clerical robes, a motorcycle suit, a German military helmet and a gas mask. The prop sculptor Brian Muir created the helmet and armour used in the film from McQuarrie's designs.

McQuarrie's Star Wars designs

McQuarrie's concept art for Darth Vader

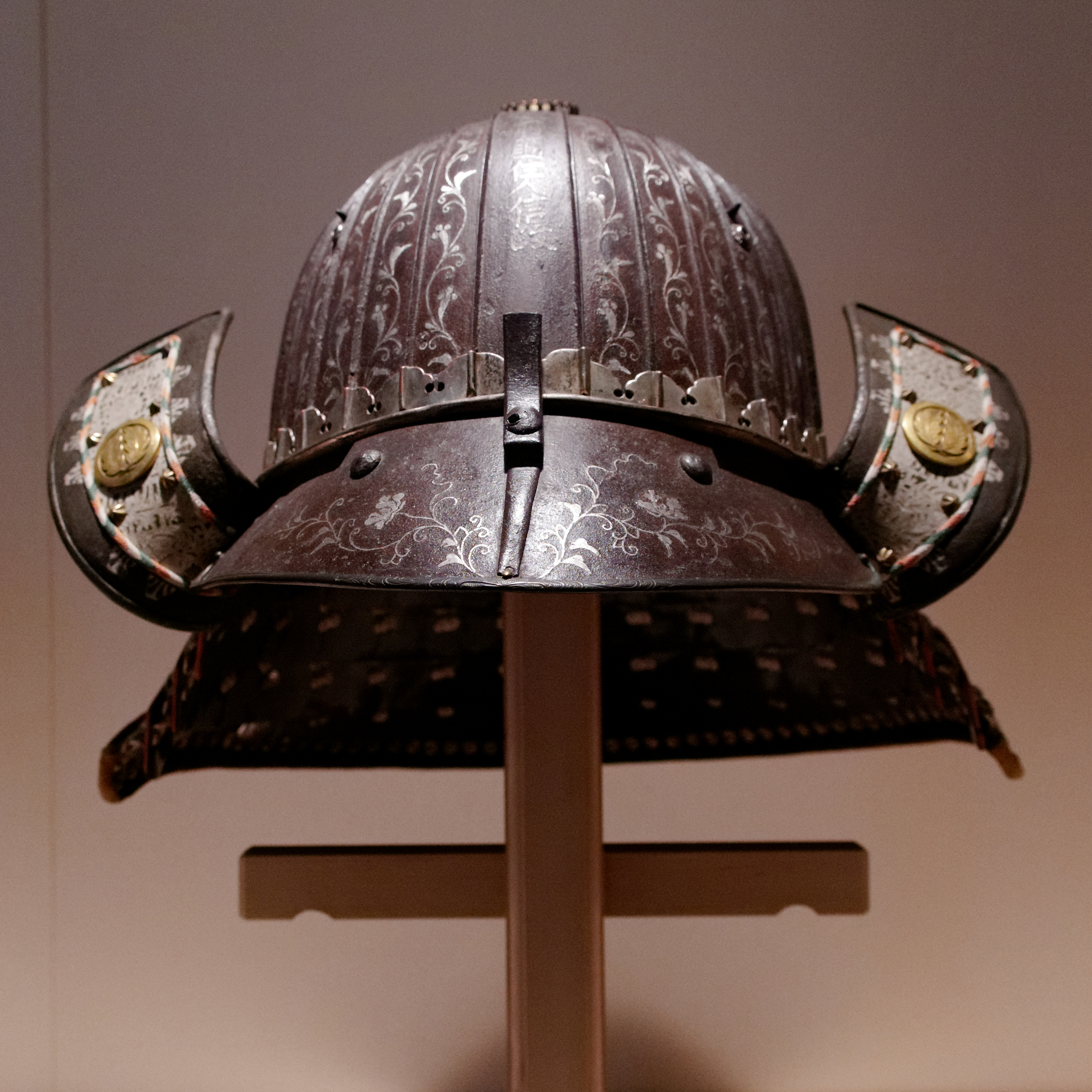
McQuarrie's design brief specified samurai influences, such as this kabuto helmet.

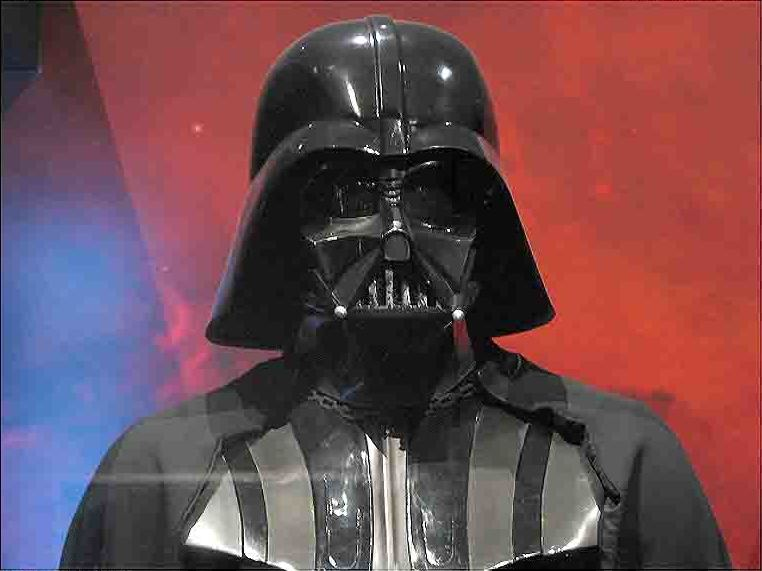
The final design of Darth Vader's helmet

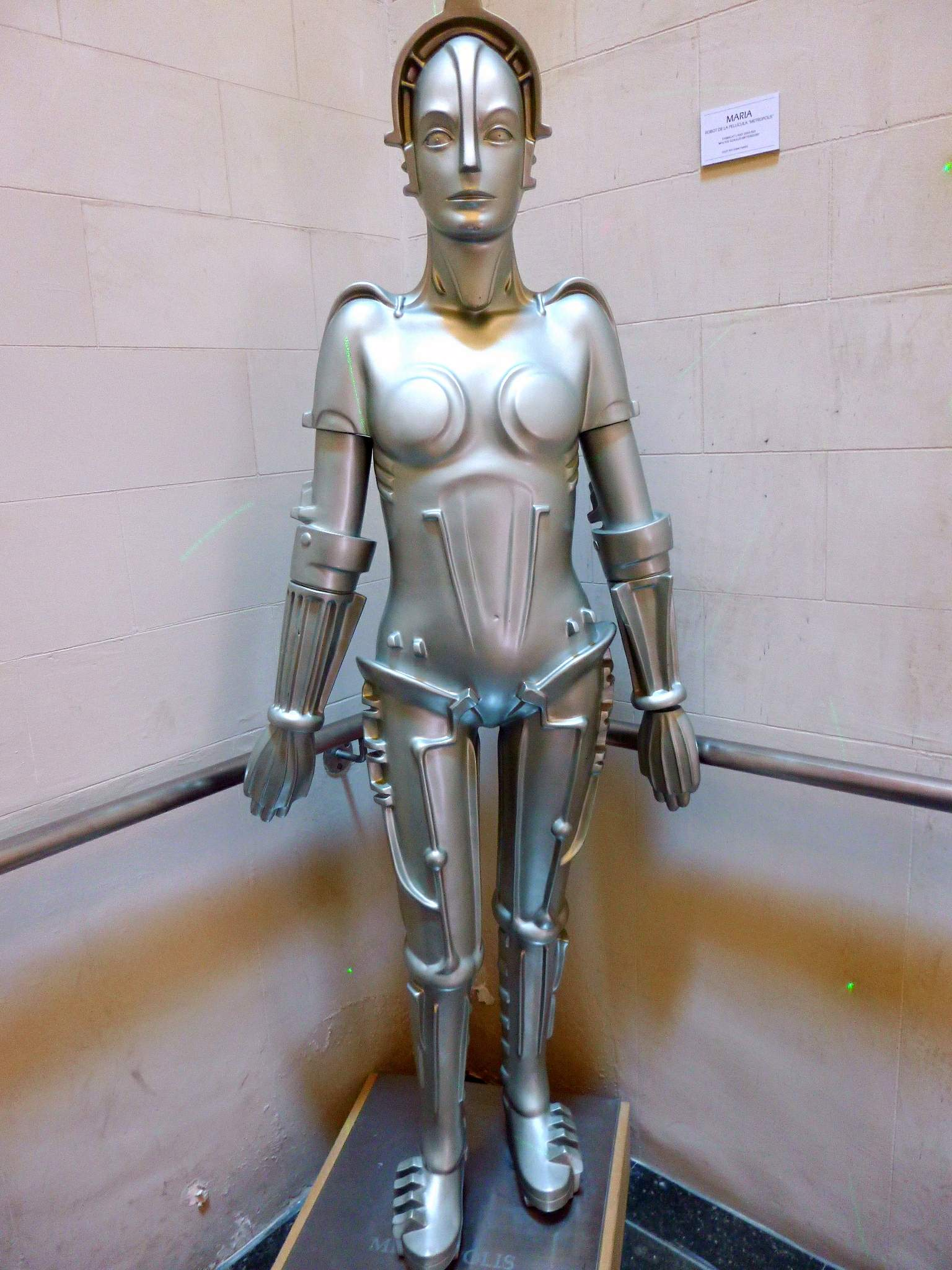
The robot from Metropolis (1927) that inspired McQuarrie

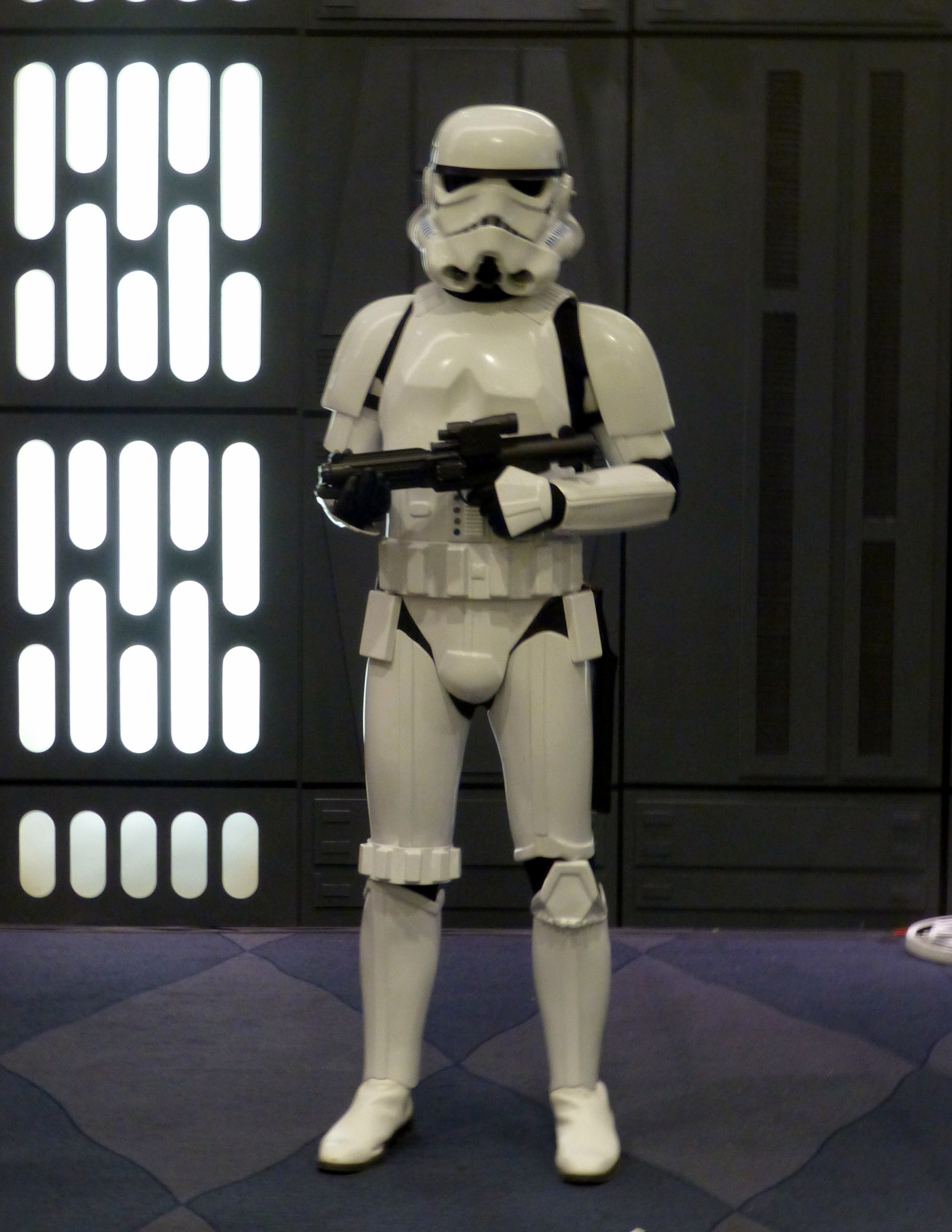
Imperial stormtroopers

The final design of the robot C-3PO

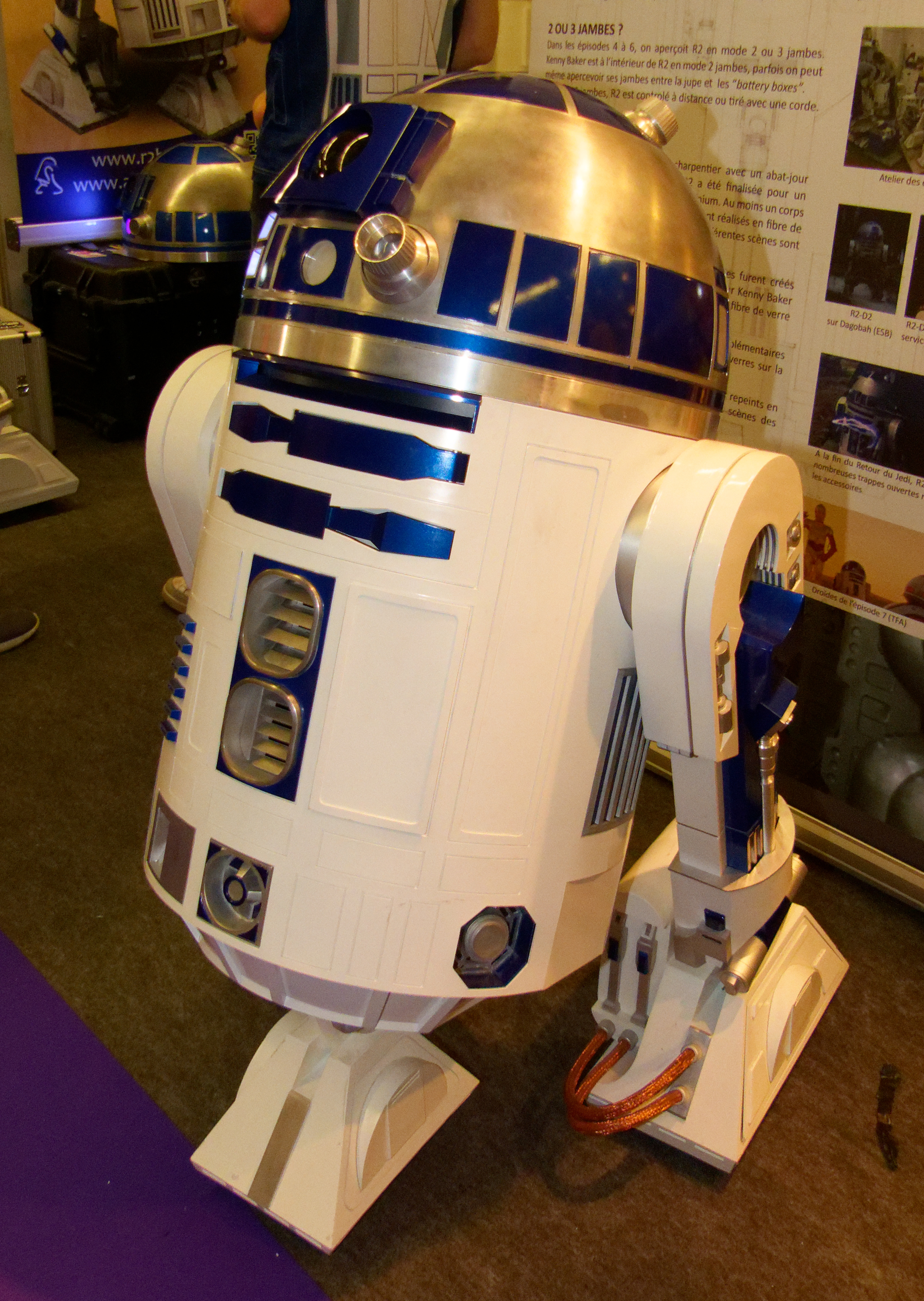
R2-D2

While McQuarrie was working on visualisation work for Lucas, he was also commissioned by an executive of Ballantine Books, Judy-Lynn del Rey, to produce the cover art of the forthcoming novelization of Star Wars. The first edition of Star Wars: From the Adventures of Luke Skywalker went to press in 1976 featuring McQuarrie's version of Darth Vader's helmet on the cover. Like the film, the book was a runaway success, and McQuarrie began a long relationship with the publisher, producing the artwork for 22 further titles for Del Rey Books between 1978 and 1987.

=== Star Trek ===
Around the time that McQuarrie was completing his work on Star Wars, he was brought on board the design team for a planned cinematic production based on Gene Roddenberry's science fiction television series, Star Trek. Titled Star Trek: Planet of the Titans, the film was to feature a redesigned USS Enterprise starship, and McQuarrie was recruited to provide the visualizations. His triangular ship design has been likened to the appearance of the Star Destroyers featured in Star Wars. Star Trek: Planet of the Titans did not make it past the pre-production phase and the project was cancelled in 1977. The design was later used in 2017's Star Trek: Discovery as the basis of the titular ship. McQuarrie later returned to work on the 1986 film Star Trek IV: The Voyage Home.

=== Star Wars sequels ===
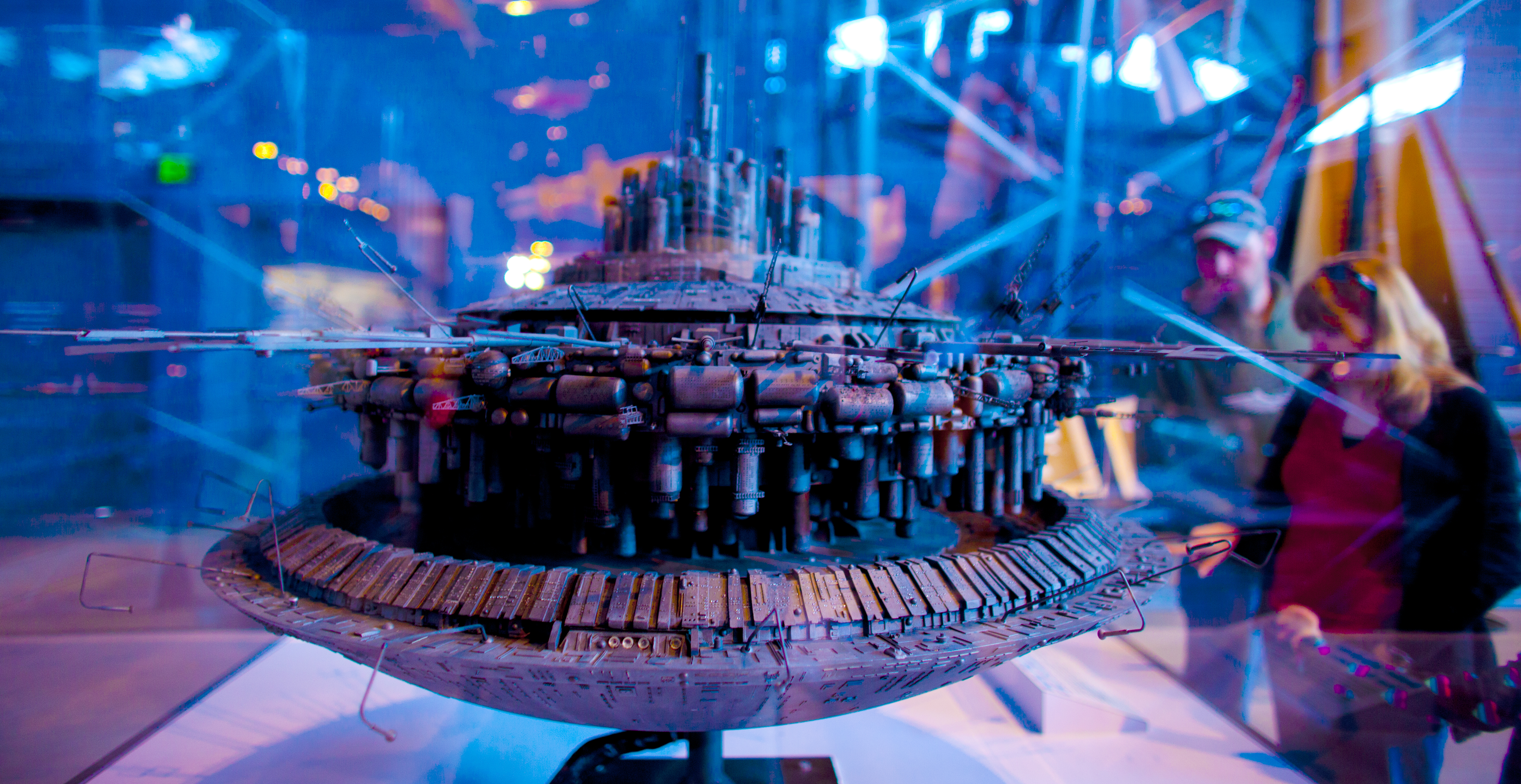
Model of the Mother Ship from Close Encounters of the Third Kind, based on McQuarrie's design

When Lucas began work on his sequel to Star Wars, The Empire Strikes Back (1980), McQuarrie was once again brought in to supply previsualization artwork. His sketches and production paintings established the appearance of some of the saga's most enduring elements, such as the gigantic AT-AT Walkers in the battle on the ice planet Hoth and the wizened elf creature Yoda. McQuarrie's design for Cloud City, a floating city in the clouds, actually originated from his early sketches for Star Wars from 1975, when he was illustrating a concept for the planet Alderaan, as described in Lucas' 1975 draft script, Adventures of the Starkiller as taken from the Journal of the Whills, Saga I: The Star Wars. McQuarrie made an uncredited cameo appearance in The Empire Strikes Back, when he appeared in the film's opening sequence in the Rebel base on Hoth as a character named General Pharl McQuarrie. In 2007, McQuarrie became part of the Star Wars action figure range when an action figure in his likeness as "General McQuarrie" was produced for the Star Wars 30th anniversary in 2007. Action figures were also produced based on McQuarrie's concept art, including conceptual versions of the Imperial Stormtrooper, Chewbacca, R2-D2 and C-3PO, Darth Vader, Han Solo, Boba Fett, Obi-Wan Kenobi, Yoda and other characters.

By the time McQuarrie was engaged on Lucas' third Star Wars picture, Return of the Jedi (1983), he had begun to experience creative fatigue. "It became less fun as time went on. I had done the best part already and I was just rehashing everything. I kept meeting myself in my thinking. It became more and more difficult to keep my enthusiasm up," McQuarrie has said. Despite his earlier success, fewer of his design ideas were included in the final cut of the film.

=== Other film and TV work ===
McQuarrie designed the alien ships in Steven Spielberg's films Close Encounters of the Third Kind (1977) and E.T. the Extra-Terrestrial (1982), while his work as the concept artist on the 1985 film Cocoon earned him the Academy Award for Visual Effects. He also worked on the 1978 TV series Battlestar Galactica, and the films Raiders of the Lost Ark and Batteries Not Included.

=== Other work ===
In 1989, Isaac Asimov commissioned McQuarrie to create art for Asimov's collection of essays and short stories titled Robot Visions. McQuarrie provided illustrations for both the cover and individual stories within Robot Visions. The book is a companion to Asimov's 1986 collection Robot Dreams, for which McQuarrie also provided illustrations and cover art; in fact, the title story of Robot Dreams was inspired by McQuarrie's art, rather than the other way around.

== Retirement ==
Rick McCallum offered McQuarrie a role as designer for the Star Wars prequel trilogy, but he declined, noting he had "run out of steam" and Industrial Light & Magic animator Doug Chiang was appointed instead. McQuarrie retired and his Star Wars concept paintings were subsequently displayed in art exhibitions, including the 1999 Star Wars: The Magic of Myth. Several of McQuarrie's unused designs from the original trilogy were utilized for the Star Wars: The Clone Wars and Star Wars Rebels animated TV series, including the planet Orto Plutonia, which was based on McQuarrie's original design of Hoth, and the characters Zeb Orrelios and Chopper, based on his original designs for Chewbacca and R2-D2, respectively.

== Personal life ==
McQuarrie married Joan Benjamin in 1983 and stayed married until his death at age 82 on March 3, 2012, in his Berkeley, CA home. McQuarrie died from complications of Parkinson's disease.

== Critical assessment ==
Christian Blauvelt of Entertainment Weekly praised McQuarrie's works as "pioneering of the 'used future' aesthetic" which unlike other science-fiction, "imagined a lived-in galaxy that was gritty, dirty, and in advance states of decay." He described McQuarrie's style as "strongly geometric subjects rendered in muted colors against a flat, purposefully compressed backdrop. A McQuarrie Star Wars design looks like what would have resulted if Salvador Dalí had sketched concepts for Universal's 1936 Flash Gordon serial by way of Sergio Leone's Old West."

Neil Kendricks of The San Diego Union-Tribune emphasised McQuarrie's importance to the Star Wars franchise, saying that the artist "holds a unique position when it comes to defining much of the look of the "Star Wars" universe."

After McQuarrie's death, George Lucas said: "His genial contribution, in the form of unequalled production paintings, propelled and inspired all of the cast and crew of the original Star Wars trilogy. When words could not convey my ideas, I could always point to one of Ralph's fabulous illustrations and say, 'do it like this'."

== Legacy ==
The current Lucasfilm creative team is employing parts of McQuarrie's original unused concept art from the seventies and eighties in the development of new Star Wars-related media.

For Star Wars Day in 2023, Lego Star Wars: The Skywalker Saga released a free DLC character named Luke Starkiller, based on McQuarrie's design.

== Filmography ==
- Star Wars (1977) (production illustrator)
- Close Encounters of the Third Kind (1977) (Mother Ship designer)
- Battlestar Galactica (1978) (production and concept illustrator)
- Star Wars Holiday Special (1978) (illustrator)
- The Empire Strikes Back (1980) (design consultant and concept artist)
- Raiders of the Lost Ark (1981) (ILM illustrator)
- E.T. the Extra-Terrestrial (1982) (scenic artist/spaceship design)
- Return of the Jedi (1983) (concept artist)
- Cocoon (1985) (concept artist)
- Star Trek IV: The Voyage Home (1986) (visual consultant)
- Batteries Not Included (1987) (concept artist)
- Nightbreed (1990) (concept artist)
- Back to the Future: The Ride (1991) (concept artist) (uncredited)

=== Actor ===
- The Empire Strikes Back (1980) as General McQuarrie (uncredited)

== Bibliography ==
McQuarrie's previsualization artwork, production sketches and paintings, and matte paintings feature prominently in the first three volumes of The Art of Star Wars book series.

- Titelman, Carol; Hoffman, Valerie, eds. (1979). The Art of Star Wars (1st ed.). New York: Ballantine Books. ISBN 0345282736.
  Reprinted 1994 ISBN 9781852865832
- Bulluck, Vic; Hoffman, Valerie (1980). Call, Deborah (ed.). The Art of The Empire Strikes Back (1st ed.). New York: Ballantine Books. ISBN 9780345293350.
  Reprinted 1994 ISBN 9780345392039
- Kasdan, Lawrence; Lucas, George (1983). The Art of Return of the Jedi - Star Wars (1st ed.). New York: Ballantine Books. ISBN 978-0345312549.
  Reprinted 1995 ISBN 9781852865856
- Anderson, Kevin J.; Carabetta, Michael (1996). Star Wars, the art of Ralph McQuarrie. San Francisco, CA: Chronicle Books. ISBN 9780811813204.
- McQuarrie, Ralph; Alinger, Brandon; Lageose, Wade; Mandel, David; Ltd, LucasFilm (2016). Star Wars Art: Ralph McQuarrie. Harry N. Abrams. ISBN 9781419717932.

== See also ==
- List of Star Wars artists
