= Unto the Fourth Generation =

"Unto the Fourth Generation" is a fantasy short story by Isaac Asimov. It first appeared in the April 1959 issue of The Magazine of Fantasy and Science Fiction (F&SF) and has been reprinted in the collections Nightfall and Other Stories (1969) and The Best Science Fiction of Isaac Asimov (1986). It is Asimov's only Jewish story.

== Plot summary ==
The story concerns Samuel Marten, an anxious 23-year-old junior executive on his way to meet with a potential customer. When Marten sees a passing truck that says Lewkowitz and Sons, Wholesale Clothiers, he unconsciously turns the name into Levkovich, then finds himself wondering why. Every time he sees some version of the name, he becomes more distracted. Marten's business meeting goes badly, and afterwards he wanders the streets of New York City, following a trail of Lefkowitzes, Lefkowiczes and Levkowitzes. He arrives in Central Park, where an old man in outdated clothing is sitting on a park bench.

The old man is Phinehas Levkovich. Levkovich is on his deathbed, having been born decades earlier in Czarist Russia. His wife and sons have died, his daughter Leah emigrated to America, and he is alone. He has prayed for a chance to meet a son of Leah's line, and his prayer has been granted. Phinehas is Marten's great-great-grandfather; Marten is Leah's daughter's daughter's son, the first son to be born to her family. Marten asks for his great-great-grandfather's blessing, and the old man gives it, then adds, "I go now to my fathers in peace, my son."

Time snaps back two hours. Marten is on his way to his business meeting, and he finds himself free of anxiety, for he somehow knows that all will be well with him.

== Background of story creation and development ==
Asimov was having lunch with F&SF's then-editor Robert P. Mills on 23 October 1958 when Mills mentioned having seen the name Lefkowitz several times, each time with a different spelling. He asked Asimov to write a story about it and Asimov, who was an acquaintance of a “Leskowitz” himself (fellow Columbia grad student Dr. Sidney Leskowitz), agreed.

When "Unto the Fourth Generation" first appeared in F&SF, Marten went through the experience without being affected by it in any way. After the story appeared, Asimov was attending a dinner with Mills. He was chatting happily with Janet Jeppson, a fan he had just met, and Mills asked her what she thought of the story. Jeppson said that it was flawed because Marten had been unaffected by his meeting with Phinehas Levkovich. Asimov decided that Jeppson was right, and when he included the story in Nightfall and Other Stories, he changed the ending so that Marten was left with a feeling of well-being. Asimov and Jeppson kept in touch, and fourteen years after having dinner together, they got married.

In his preface to the story for Nightfall and Other Stories, Asimov commented that this story is the only Jewish story it occurred to him to write.

The name Levkovich (and its many variants) comes from the Polish name Lewek, a diminutive of Lew, meaning lion.
