= A Loint of Paw =

- Short story by Isaac Asimov
- Country: United States
- Language: English
- Genre: Science fiction

Publication
- Published in: The Magazine of Fantasy & Science Fiction
- Publication type: Digest magazine
- Publication date: August, 1957

"A Loint of Paw" is a vignette by American writer Isaac Asimov, first published in The Magazine of Fantasy & Science Fiction in August 1957. It was reprinted in the 1968 collection Asimov's Mysteries and the 1986 collection The Best Science Fiction of Isaac Asimov. The title of the story is a play on the words "a point of law", which alludes to fact that the punchline of the story is a play on the words of an old saw. Asimov's author's note states that he considers "a play on words the noblest form of wit."

== Plot summary ==
The plot involves a criminal named Stein who stole over $100,000 through fraud, then entered a time machine set for the day after the statute of limitations for his crime expired. The story tells how the case against Stein was prosecuted and defended, and that the judge's ruling was delivered in the form of a play on words: "A niche in time saves Stein".
