= I Just Make Them Up, See! =

- Short story by Isaac Asimov
- Country: United States
- Language: English
- Genre: Science fiction

Publication
- Published in: The Magazine of Fantasy and Science Fiction
- Publication type: Periodical
- Publication date: February 1958

"I Just Make Them Up, See!" is a comic science fiction poem by American writer Isaac Asimov, written in 1957. The poem is a monologue from a fan, asking Asimov how he comes up with his ideas. The question is not answered in the poem, but rather the title itself: I Just Make Them Up, See!

It was collected in the anthologies Nine Tomorrows, The Best Science Fiction of Isaac Asimov, and The Complete Stories.
