= Rejection slip =

Rejection letter to an author

A rejection slip is a notice to a freelancer, particularly a freelance author, that a submission has been taken from the slushpile, read or examined, and rejected for purchase. The format may range from a form letter with one or more boxes checked off, to a lengthy handwritten note explaining in detail why the piece is not being purchased, often inviting the freelancer to make further submissions.

Due to the central role of rejection slips in the life of a freelancer, rejection slips play a large role in creative culture, being the subject of many cartoons, stories and even poems. Charles Bukowski's first commercial sale was a short story titled "Aftermath of a Lengthy Rejection Slip". Isaac Asimov, better known for his prose, wrote a poem titled Rejection Slips.
