= The Deep (short story) =

- Short story by Isaac Asimov
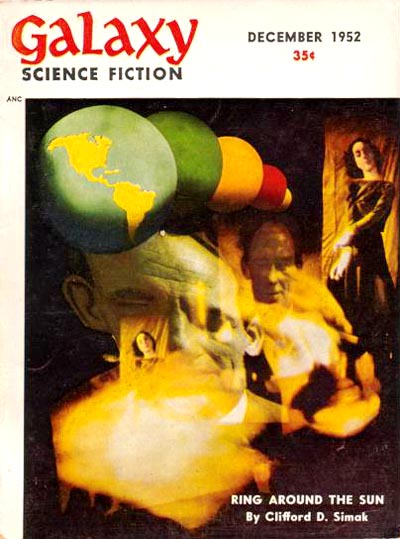
- Language: English
- Genre: Science fiction

Publication
- Published in: Galaxy Science Fiction
- Publisher: World Editions
- Publication date: December 1952
- Publication place: United States
- Media type: Magazine

"The Deep" is a science fiction novelette by American writer Isaac Asimov. It was written in July 1952 and first published in the December 1952 issue of Galaxy Science Fiction. The story subsequently appeared in the Asimov collections The Martian Way and Other Stories (1955) and The Best of Isaac Asimov (1973). In In Memory Yet Green, Asimov wrote that his motive in writing the story was to deliberately test whether one could do anything in science fiction, so he invented a society in which mother love was considered obscene.

== Plot summary ==
The Race is a technologically advanced alien society with telepathic abilities that lives underground on a planet with rapidly depleting energy resources. The aliens decide to teleport themselves to a new planet, which happens to be Earth. A sentry sent by The Race to establish a teleport on Earth suffers shock when exposed to unfamiliar aspects of human life, including maternal bonding, weather changes, and the inability to communicate telepathically.

== Story notes ==
In The Best of Isaac Asimov Asimov described "The Deep" as the "sleeper" of the collection, generating very little response despite his liking it.

The basic idea of the story is rather similar to The Gods Themselves. In both works, a race of highly inhuman aliens is on the brink of extinction due to their sun dying, and decides to use Earth as a source of energy.
