= Shaggy God story =

Usage of science fiction to explain biblical themes

A shaggy God story is a story in a minor science fiction genre that attempts to explain Biblical concepts with science fiction tropes. The term was coined by writer and critic Brian W. Aldiss in a pseudonymous column in the October 1965 issue of New Worlds. The term is a pun on the phrase "shaggy dog story", which describes a lengthy or complicated story with an anticlimactic conclusion.

A typical shaggy God story might feature a pair of astronauts landing on a lush and virgin world and in the last line their names are revealed as Adam and Eve. The television show The Twilight Zone used several versions of this, the most notable being "Probe 7, Over and Out". Another classic example is Isaac Asimov's 1956 short story "The Last Question", which ends with the protagonist supercomputer exclaiming: "Let there be light!"

The creation of the term is often misattributed to Michael Moorcock. Moorcock edited the issue of New Worlds in which Aldiss coined the term in a pseudonymous column. It has been suggested that many assumed Moorcock to be the author of the column. The issue was cleared up in an August 2004 David Langford column in SFX magazine.

== The genre as a cliché ==
Brian Stableford noted in The Encyclopedia of Science Fiction that a frequently written, but rarely printed, story submitted to science-fiction magazines features a male and female astronaut marooned on a habitable planet and "reveal[s] (in the final line) that their names are Adam and Eve". Among the "partial list of overworked ideas that should be strenuously avoided" that H. L. Gold of Galaxy Science Fiction in 1953 warned prospective writers of were "the characters we have been reading about are Adam and Eve or Jesus, the creation of a miniature universe in a laboratory by a scientist whose name turns out to be an anagram of Jehovah". "Dr. Peristyle" (Brian W. Aldiss) of New Worlds wrote in 1965 that "The shaggy god story is the bane of magazine editors, who get approximately one story a week set in a garden of Eden spelt Ee-Duhn". The genre is also listed as a cliché in the Science Fiction Writers of America's Turkey City Lexicon and David Langford's SFX magazine column on same. Will Ferguson references the cliché extensively in his novel Generica (2001).

== Expansions of the term ==
Shaggy God themes can be seen as an effort to harmonize religious accounts about the origin of human beings with science fiction tropes such as alien races, interstellar travel, genetic manipulation, the uplift of primitive races and man's place in the galactic life cycle.

David Brin's Uplift Universe is a series of science fiction works that deal with the idea of advanced interstellar cultures who identify proto-sentient species and genetically manipulate them into star-faring cultures in their own right (often enslaving them for thousands of years as payment). In the novels, proponents of the view that humans were uplifted by a galactic culture (as opposed to evolving into sentience) are called "Dänikenites".

2001: A Space Odyssey was called this by film critic John Simon. One interpretation of David Bowman's entrance into the EVA pod before entering space (the new Eden) to become a Star Child suggests Adam and Eve and the dawn of new man. Some people interpreted Bowman's transforming into the Star Child as his turning into a god or godlike being. The plot also involves an alien intelligence's "creating" man by improving upon mankind's hominid ancestors.

== See also ==
- Euhemerism – Interpretation of myth as originating from exaggerated real occurances
