= Marooned off Vesta =

- Short story by Isaac Asimov
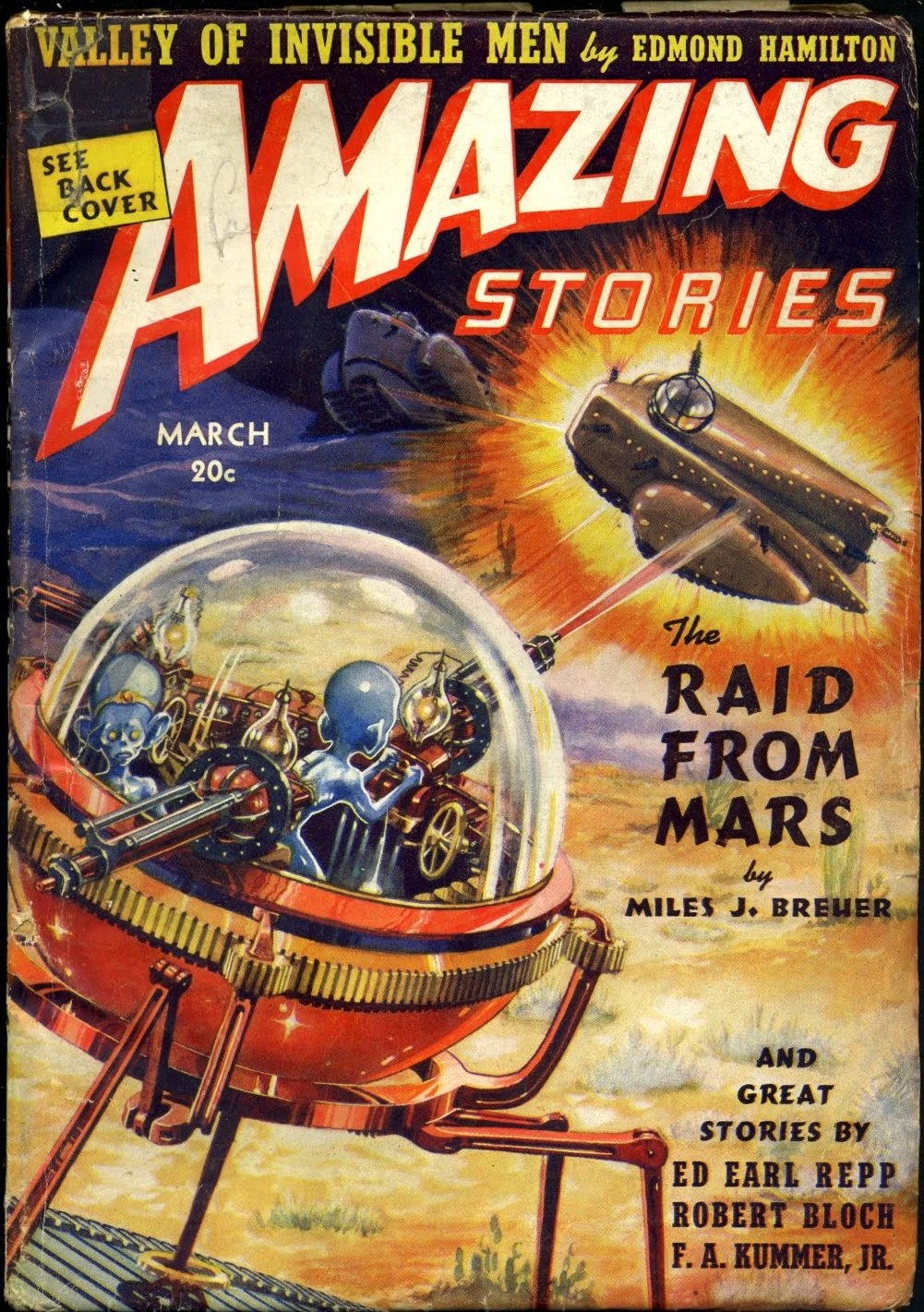
- 1939 March issue of Amazing Stories, where the story was originally published
- Country: United States
- Language: English
- Genre: Science fiction

Publication
- Published in: Amazing Stories
- Publication type: Periodical
- Publisher: Ziff-Davis
- Media type: Print (Magazine)
- Publication date: March 1939

Chronology
- Series: Silver Queen
—	Ring Around the Sun

"Marooned off Vesta" is a science fiction short story by American writer Isaac Asimov. It was the third story he wrote, and the first to be published. Written in July 1938 when Asimov was 18, it was rejected by Astounding Science Fiction in August, then accepted in October by Amazing Stories, appearing in the March 1939 issue. Asimov first included it in his 1968 story collection Asimov's Mysteries, and subsequently in the 1973 collection The Best of Isaac Asimov.

== Plot summary ==
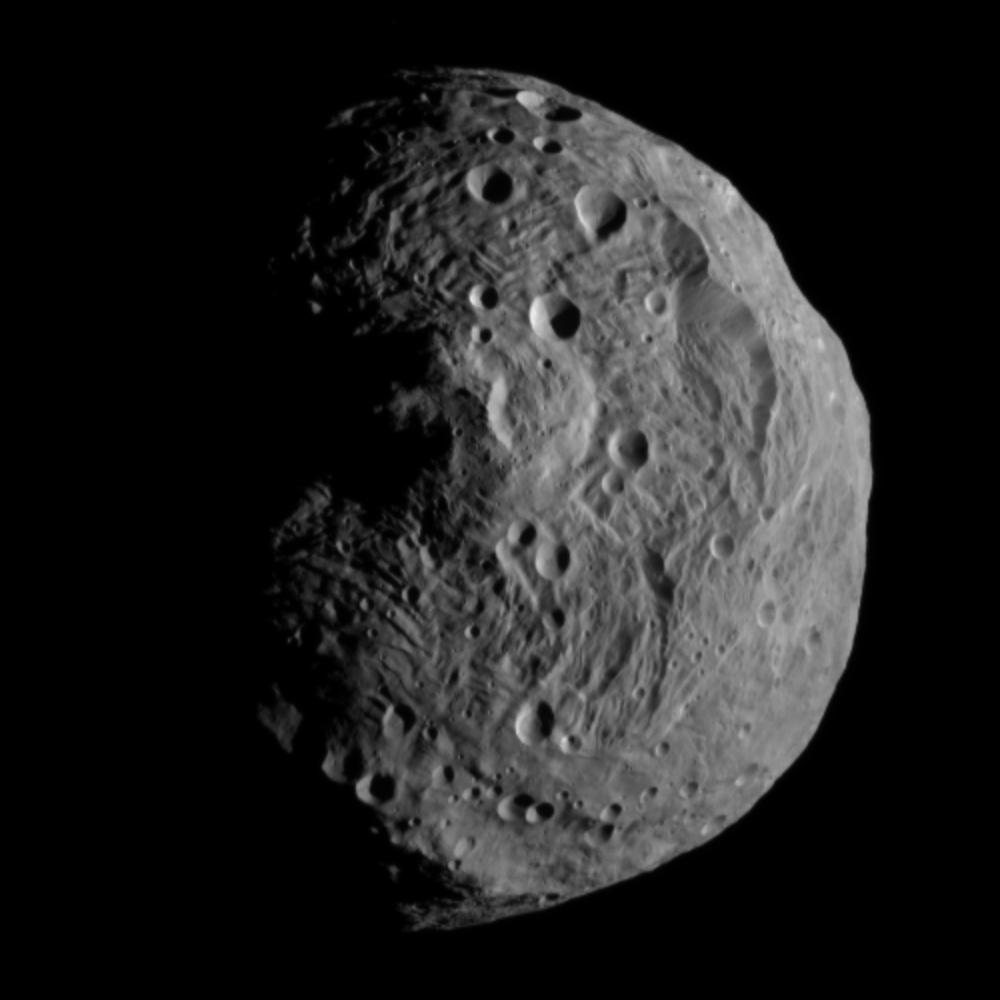
Vesta.

"Marooned off Vesta" tells the story of three men who survive the wreck of the spaceship Silver Queen in the asteroid belt and find themselves trapped in orbit around the asteroid Vesta. They have at their disposal three airtight rooms, one spacesuit, three days' worth of air, a week's supply of food, and a year's supply of water. They are initially despondent about their impending suffocation until one of the men is inspired to melt a hole in the water tank. This begins to propel them towards Vesta, where a small community of humans lives.

The story accurately portrays the physics and experiences involved with being in space, a theme that often re-emerges in Asimov's later works.

== Sequel ==
In 1958, to commemorate the 20th anniversary of the story's appearance, Asimov wrote a sequel titled "Anniversary", set twenty years after the original. Both stories appeared in the March 1959 issue of Amazing Stories and later in the collection Asimov's Mysteries.

== Reception ==
Reviewing an anthology including the story, Algis Budrys said "'Marooned off Vesta' was indeed Ike's first sale. His first story came several attempts later". He also described "Anniversary" as "a badly contrived stunt". Asimov wrote in 1973, "Far be it from me to crave indulgence, but I think it is important to understand that at the time I wrote and sold the story (in 1938) I was eighteen years old".
