= Rejection Slips =

- Short story by Isaac Asimov
- Country: United States
- Language: English
- Genre: Science fiction short story

Publication
- Published in: Nine Tomorrows
- Publication type: Anthology
- Publisher: Doubleday
- Media type: Print anthology, Hardback
- Publication date: 1959

"Rejection Slips" is a comic poem by American author Isaac Asimov, written in 1959 for the collection Nine Tomorrows. It illustrates the three approaches of the most important editors in science fiction at the time (John W. Campbell of Astounding, Horace Gold of Galaxy Science Fiction and Anthony Boucher of The Magazine of Fantasy and Science Fiction) when rejecting a story. Campbell sent lengthy and turgid analyses, Gold sent abusive little notes, and Boucher’s rejection slips were so gentle that one wondered whether he was accepting the story or not.
