= Franchise (short story) =

- Short story by Isaac Asimov
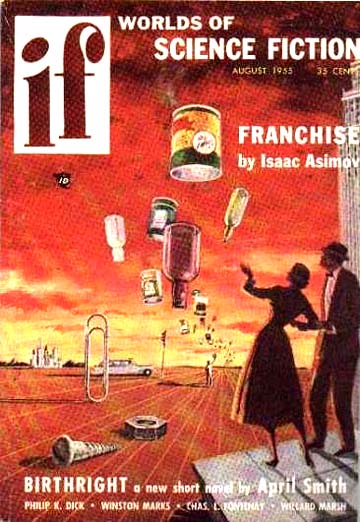
- Country: United States
- Language: English
- Genre: Science fiction

Publication
- Published in: If
- Publisher: Quinn Publishing
- Media type: Magazine
- Publication date: August 1955

Chronology
- Series: Multivac
Question	The Dead Past

"Franchise" is a science fiction short story by American writer Isaac Asimov. It first appeared in the August 1955 issue of the magazine If: Worlds of Science Fiction, and was reprinted in the collections Earth Is Room Enough (1957) and Robot Dreams (1986). It is one of a loosely connected series of stories concerning a fictional computer called Multivac. It is the first story in which Asimov dealt with computers as computers and not as immobile robots.

== Plot summary ==
In the future, the United States has converted to an "electronic democracy" where the computer Multivac selects a single person to answer a number of questions. Multivac will then use the answers and other data to determine what the results of an election would be, avoiding the need for an actual election to be held.

The story centers around Norman Muller of Bloomington, Indiana, the man chosen as "Voter of the Year" in the 2008 U.S. presidential election. Although the law requires him to accept the dubious honour, he is not sure that he wants the responsibility of representing the entire electorate, worrying that the result will be unfavorable and he will be blamed.

However, after "voting", he is very proud that the citizens of the United States had, through him, "exercised once again their free, untrammeled franchise" – a statement that is somewhat ironic as the citizens did not actually get to vote; even he himself did not vote for any candidate, law, or issue.

The idea of a computer predicting whom the electorate would vote for instead of actually holding an election was probably inspired by the UNIVAC I's correct prediction of the result of the U.S. presidential election in 1952.

== Influence ==
The use of a single representative individual to stand in for the entire population can help in evaluating the sensitivity of a statistical method. "Franchise" was cited as the inspiration of the term "Asimov data set", where an ensemble of simulated experiments can be replaced by a single representative experiment.

== Franchise (Isaac Asimov Collection) ==
"Franchise" was the title story of a 1989 compilation Franchise illustrated by David Shannon (ISBN 978-0886822323, ISBN 978-0613833899).
