= The Machine That Won the War (short story) =

Short story by Isaac Asimov

"The Machine That Won the War" is a science fiction short story by American writer Isaac Asimov. The story first appeared in the October 1961 issue of The Magazine of Fantasy & Science Fiction, and was reprinted in the collections Nightfall and Other Stories (1969) and Robot Dreams (1986). It was also printed in a contemporary edition of Reader's Digest, illustrated. It is one of a loosely connected series of such stories concerning a fictional supercomputer called Multivac.

== Plot summary ==
Three influential leaders of the human race meet in the aftermath of a successful war against the Denebians. Discussing how the vast and powerful Multivac computer was a decisive factor in the war, each of the men admits that in fact, he falsified his part of the decision process because he felt that the situation was too complex to follow normal procedures.

John Henderson, Multivac's Chief Programmer, admits that he altered the data being fed to Multivac, since the populace could not be trusted to report accurate information in the current situation.

Max Jablonski then admits that he altered the data that Multivac produced, since he knew that Multivac was not in good working order due to manpower and spare parts shortages.

Finally, Lamar Swift, executive director of the Solar Federation, reveals that he had not trusted the reports produced by Multivac, and had made the final decisions purely on the toss of a coin.
