= Point of View (short story) =

- Short story by Isaac Asimov
- Country: United States
- Language: English
- Genre: Science fiction

Publication
- Published in: Boys' Life
- Publication date: July 1975

"Point of View" is a short story by American writer Isaac Asimov that first appeared in Boys' Life magazine in July 1975. Due to the poor reception it received, it was only reprinted in the collection The Complete Robot in 1982. It is one of a loosely connected series of such stories concerning a fictional computer called Multivac.

== Plot summary ==
Roger's father works with a supercomputer called a Multivac, which has been malfunctioning lately as it comes up with different solutions each time to problems it is asked to solve. After coworkers tell him to take a break, he takes Roger out to lunch. His father tells him what he thinks is wrong with the Multivac, and then from this Roger decides that it is like a child, and like one needs a break from work, saying that if you made a kid do work all day than it would get stuff wrong on purpose. His father reassure this inference with Roger, who confirms it saying, "Dad, a kid's got to play too."
