= The Last Answer =

1980 short story by Isaac Asimov

"The Last Answer" is a science fiction short story by American writer Isaac Asimov. It was first published in the January 1980 issue of Analog Science Fiction and Fact, and reprinted in the collections The Winds of Change and Other Stories (1983), The Best Science Fiction of Isaac Asimov (1986), and Robot Dreams (1986).

== Plot summary ==
An atheist physicist, Murray Templeton, dies of a heart attack and is greeted by a being of supposedly infinite knowledge. This being, referred to as the Voice, tells the physicist the nature of his life after death, as a nexus of electromagnetic forces. The Voice concludes that, while by all human ideas he most resembles God, he is contrary to any human conception of the being. The Voice informs him that all of the Universe is a creation of the Voice, the purpose of which was to result in intelligent life which, after death, the Voice could cull for his own purposes—to wit, Templeton, like all the others, is to think, for all eternity, so as to amuse him. Conversing with the Voice, Templeton learns that the Voice desires original thoughts by which to please His curiosity, but surrenders that yes, in fact, if He so desired, the Voice could happen upon those thoughts himself, of his own effort.

The physicist is appalled by the idea of thinking and discovering for no reason but to amuse a being capable of easily out-thinking him with a bit of effort. Templeton decides, therefore, to direct his thoughts towards spiting the Voice, whom he regards as a capricious entity, by destroying himself. The Voice dissuades him by pointing out it is easily within His power to reconstitute Templeton's disembodied form with that method of suicide, whatever it may be, disabled. Through further inquiry, Templeton discovers that the Voice (in a classic counterargument to the logical regression of the First Cause argument for the existence of God) has no knowledge of his own creation. Templeton realizes that this, in turn, suggests he has no knowledge of his own destruction, and concludes that the only vengeance for this tyranny is also the ultimate vengeance, and resolves to destroy the Voice.

At this epiphany and decision, the Voice reflects satisfaction, thinking that Templeton reached this conclusion rather faster than most of the countless beings currently trapped in the same condition, implying that the one thing the Voice truly wishes to learn from his thralls is the method by which he can be destroyed.

== Reception ==
Paul J. Nahin has described "The Last Answer" as "one of the best stories [Asimov] ever wrote", and posited that it "illustrates [Asimov's] personal beliefs (and even hopes) about God and the hereafter"; however, Nahin states that he is "not convinced (...) that Asimov made his case logically", arguing that—given infinite time—the Voice should be able to do, or think of anything, that Templeton does.

== See also ==
- The Best Science Fiction of Isaac Asimov
