= I'm in Marsport Without Hilda =

- Short story by Isaac Asimov
- Country: United States
- Language: English
- Genres: Science fiction, mystery

Publication
- Published in: Venture
- Publication type: Periodical
- Publisher: Fantasy House
- Media type: Print (Magazine, Hardback & Paperback)
- Publication date: November 1957

"I'm in Marsport Without Hilda" is a science fiction short story by American writer Isaac Asimov. The story first appeared in the November 1957 issue of Venture Science Fiction Magazine, and was reprinted in the collection Nine Tomorrows in 1959, in a bowdlerized version. The complete original version appeared in Asimov's Mysteries (1968). It is a mystery story in a science fiction setting.

== Plot summary ==
A Galactic Service agent, Max, is in Marsport without his wife, Hilda, for the first time in a long time. He plans to visit a beautiful and accommodating woman of his acquaintance named Flora, but his plans are disrupted when he receives an unexpected assignment. His supervisor informs him that a new source of altered Spaceoline has appeared. While regular Spaceoline is a common anti-nausea treatment, a chemical modification can turn it into a dangerous narcotic. The Service suspects that one man in a group of three VIPs is smuggling the drug.

All three men appear to be in the inebriated, free-association state which regular Spaceoline produces, but since the actual criminal cannot afford to impair his own judgment, he must be faking. The easiest method of determining the criminal among them would be a simple search. However, Max's supervisor firmly rejects this: only one of three men is guilty, and the consequences of performing such a rough operation on two innocent men of very high social standing would be extremely unfortunate. Max is forced to improvise.

Max converses with the three men, trying to find the faker, but the criminal is clever enough to avoid detection. All three men take turns free-associating among themselves, and all three keep making statements which might be subtle clues or taunts, but could equally well be innocent. Growing ever more desperate as his time runs out, Max starts describing his planned evening with Flora in graphic detail. The two honest men are too inebriated to be affected, but the faker starts sweating and his breath becomes heavier, and that gives him away.

Max manages to convince his overjoyed supervisor to give him a substantial monetary bonus in return for his service, which he uses to smooth over the problems between himself and Flora that arose when he had to postpone their date. However, just as he is about to meet Flora, his wife arrives in Marsport.
