= Jokester =

- Short story by Isaac Asimov
- Country: United States
- Language: English
- Genre: Science fiction

Publication
- Published in: Infinity Science Fiction
- Publisher: Royal Publications
- Media type: Magazine
- Publication date: December 1956

Chronology
- Series: Multivac
The Last Question	All the Troubles of the World

"Jokester" is a science fiction short story by American writer Isaac Asimov. It first appeared in the December 1956 issue of Infinity Science Fiction. It involves a common theme in a number of Asimov's stories about a powerful fictional computer called Multivac: only a specialist knows which questions to ask Multivac in order to receive meaningful answers.

== Plot summary ==
Noel Meyerhof is a "Grand Master", one of a small cadre of Earth's recognised geniuses, who has the intuition to know what questions are important enough to ask Multivac. The senior computer analyst notices that Meyerhof tells jokes to Multivac and becomes worried about the mental state of Meyerhof. Eventually Meyerhof discloses that he wants to ask Multivac two questions he feels to be important. The first one is, what is the source of the jokes. He explains that whoever tells a joke, they either heard it from someone else or read in a book and nobody claims to be an author of the joke. The only kind of humor that can be non-borrowed are puns. But puns are supposed to be unfunny and the proper response to a pun is to groan rather than laugh.

Multivac eventually tells them that humour is actually a tool for the psychological study of the human race by extraterrestrials, similarly to how humans study mice. They needed to isolate the responses to their jokes from original ones, so they "programmed" us to react differently to puns.

The second Meyerhof's question was, what will happen when the humankind learn the answer to the first question. Multivac says this will make humour useless as a tool, so the aliens will cease using it... And suddenly the characters of the story feel that they cannot recall any joke.

== Prints ==
It first appeared in the December 1956 issue of Infinity Science Fiction and was reprinted in the collections Earth Is Room Enough (1957), The Far Ends of Time and Earth (1979), The Best Science Fiction of Isaac Asimov (1986), Robot Dreams (1986), and The Complete Stories, Volume 1 (1990).

== Adaptations ==
The story was adapted as a 30 minute broadcast, read by Henry Goodman, in 2006 by BBC 7 (now BBC Radio 4 Extra).
