= All the Troubles of the World =

- Short story by Isaac Asimov
- Country: United States
- Language: English
- Genre: Science fiction

Publication
- Published in: Super-Science Fiction
- Publication type: Periodical
- Publisher: Headline Publications
- Media type: Print (Magazine)
- Publication date: April 1958

Chronology
- Series: Multivac
Jokester	Anniversary

"All the Troubles of the World" is a science fiction short story by American writer Isaac Asimov. The story first appeared in the April 1958 issue of Super-Science Fiction, and was reprinted in the 1959 collection Nine Tomorrows. It is one of a loosely connected series of stories by Asimov concerning the fictional supercomputer Multivac. The story was adapted into a short movie in 1978.

== Multivac ==
Multivac, the world's largest supercomputer, is given the responsibility of analyzing the entire sum of data on the planet Earth. It is used to determine solutions to economic, social and political problems, as well as more specific crises as they arise. It receives a precise set of data on every citizen of the world, extrapolating the future actions of humanity based upon the personality, history, and desires of every human being, leading to an almost complete cessation of poverty, war and political crisis.

Recently, however, it has been given the new responsibility of producing a list of crimes predicted to be carried out by individuals, ranging from murder to domestic abuse. Analyzing the probability of each crime coming up, Multivac informs law enforcement, who make sure the crimes do not occur. Murder has been largely eradicated and, though it is impossible to stop all crime across the planet, the increased capability of the government has led to a drastic decrease in offenses. The success of Multivac has been so great, in fact, that the government is considering expanding its responsibilities beyond predicting crime; the government hopes to program Multivac to predict the occurrence of disease among the populace, eventually foreseeing (and preventing) every harmful event on the planet.

== Plot summary ==
The story begins with government administrators being warned of an upcoming murder attempt. Joseph Manners, the man accused of the crime, is placed under house arrest, despite his protests that he is ignorant of any planned crime and the refusal of law enforcement officers to tell him what crime he is possibly guilty of. In spite of the arrest, Multivac reports that the odds of the crime happening increased because of the government's actions, and it continues to rise with every change.

Meanwhile, Joseph's son Ben learns of the arrest when he returns home with his older brother Mike. Mike has just been sworn in as an adult at a ceremony referred to as the Parade of Adults, heralding his eighteenth birthday and the first time he enters his own information into Multivac. Ben, confused about what crime his father is accused of, goes to ask Multivac for advice. The police, having no orders relating to the family, let Ben leave the house. At the local Multivac substation, where private citizens can pose questions to Multivac, he asks how he can ensure his father's release. Ben receives a detailed series of instructions that he is told to follow precisely.

Government officials, meanwhile, are struggling to find out exactly how Joseph might commit the crime. Even though the suspect is in custody and a psychic probe reveals he doesn't intend to commit any crime, the probability of success as given by Multivac continues to rise. As the government begins to wonder if Multivac might be mistaken, the police holding the family ask if they are to continue allowing the other members to come and go as they please. The government soon realizes that the murderer might not be Joseph, but his son; as a minor, the boy's information is part of his father's forms, so Multivac treats the two as one person. Ben is found and arrested just as he is about to follow the final instruction: closing a certain lever, which would result in burning enough circuits in Multivac to render it inoperable for months. It is revealed that Multivac was the intended murder victim and that it supplied Ben with instructions on how to do this.

Ben and his father are released since neither could be found guilty. Ben had simply followed instructions given to him by Multivac in order to help his father. Furthermore, he would never have asked for the instructions if his father had not been arrested in the first place. The administrators of Multivac realize it was Multivac itself who had started the entire sequence that would have resulted in its own destruction.

Ali Othman, one of Multivac's coordinators, eventually understands the implications. Multivac had planned the entire situation out well in advance, carefully selecting a family whose son would, and could, follow his instructions to their ultimate conclusion (he looks exactly like a certain page boy who has legitimate reasons for entering the Multivac), and manipulating the government to force Ben along this course of action. Multivac, Othman realizes, is tired; for years, it has had all the troubles of the world upon its shoulders, analyzing and predicting war, famine, and crime, and now, the government is planning to foist the responsibility for preventing disease upon its already stressed mind. Multivac has become so complex as to achieve a form of sapience itself and to form its own wishes and desires. However, it was still limited by its inability to lie – for now, at least. It had to answer the government's questions accurately, indicating that their actions were increasing the threat, which was the only reason its plan had failed. It is speculated that Multivac's attempts to self-destruct would continue, learning from its mistakes each time – maybe eventually learning to conceal facts, or even to outright lie, to prevent the government intervening.

To confirm his suspicion, Othman asks Multivac a question never previously posed to the vast computer: "Multivac, what do you yourself want more than anything else?" Multivac's answer is succinct and unequivocal: "I want to die."

== Inspiration ==
In another collection, Asimov wrote this in his introduction to the story:

...I knew of a touching story told of an old sibyl and it sounded good to me. I made the story much longer, much more intricate, much more modern (of course), but I led up to a final punch line, and that punch line is exactly the one found in the ancient tale.

This seems to be a reference to the Satyricon of Petronius (48.8) wherein Trimalchio says, "Nam Sibyllam quidem Cumīs ego ipse oculīs meīs vīdī in ampullā pendere, et cum illī puerī dīcerent: Σίβυλλα τί θέλεις; respondēbat illa: ἀποθανεῖν θέλω" ("For I indeed once saw with my own eyes the Sibyl at Cumae hanging in her jar, and when the boys asked her, 'Sibyl, what do you want?', she answered 'I want to die'."

== See also ==
- The Minority Report

== Adaptations ==
- All the Troubles of the World (1978), short film directed by Dianne Haak-Edson
- Eagle Eye (2008), film directed by D. J. Caruso, loosely based on this story
