= Profession (novella) =

1957 novella by Isaac Asimov

- Short story by Isaac Asimov
- Country: United States
- Language: English
- Genre: Science fiction

Publication
- Published in: Astounding Science Fiction
- Publication type: Periodical
- Publisher: Street & Smith
- Media type: Print (Magazine, Hardback & Paperback)
- Publication date: July 1957

"Profession" is a science fiction novella by American writer Isaac Asimov. The story first appeared in the July 1957 issue of Astounding Science Fiction and was the lead story in the 1959 collection Nine Tomorrows.

== Plot summary ==
The author presents a centralized Earth society of the sixty-sixth century, in which children are educated by almost instantaneous direct computer/brain interface, a process known as taping. This system is similar to the BrainCap, a concept later explored by Arthur C. Clarke. Besides educating its own people this way, Earth also supplies educated professionals to other planets, the Outworlds.

Every persons job is dictated by an analysis of their brain. The most talented compete in the job "Olympics" in the chance of being bought by an advanced Outworld.

George Platen is determined to be a Computer Programmer, a profession in demand, and he hopes to qualify for "export" to a top-flight Outworld. On Reading Day, however, concerns are raised about George's ability to be Educated. On George's Education Day, he is told that his brain is unfit for any form of Education. He is drugged and sent to a House for the Feeble Minded.

Although not under physical guard, George stays in the House for a year, where the staff tolerates and even encourages his philosophical and intellectual ruminations as a way to pass the time. He is befriended by Omani, who seems to take a personal interest in George's plight. George then determines to escape, to leave and seek out Dr. Antonelli who told him he was feeble-minded, and confront him.

George visits the Olympics, which are happening in San Francisco at that time. He meets his friend Armand Trevelyan, who has been Taped as a 'Metallurgist, Nonferrous'. Trev is excited about his opportunities but performs poorly on the Beeman spectrograph—his Taping was inadequate regarding the new device—and he is forced to take employment on a fourth-rate Outworld. George, watching Trev bitterly depart, wishes him well. Trev turns and sarcastically asks, "Well, what have you done?" He then shakes George. A passing policeman breaks up the scuffle and asks George for his identity card. His ruse is up, he will be exposed as an Uneducated escapee.

Suddenly a stranger appears. He gives the policeman his business card and takes possession of George. The stranger introduces himself as Ladislas Ingenescu, Registered Historian. George and Ingenescu enter into a long conversation about history, society, and progress. George impatiently demands, and Ingenescu obtains for him, an interview with a Novian, an Outworlder on Earth to purchase talent. The Outworlder knows Ingenescu personally. He expresses anger at the Registered Historian (why to a Registered Historian, George wonders?) over Earth continually introducing very minor changes to the Tapes — such as the recent addition of the Beeman spectrograph for Metallurgists — necessitating the Outworlds to keep spending money to stay up to date. The Registered Historian introduces George as someone who may have a better solution. George contends that people can learn in ways other than being Taped, such as by reading books and in discussion with those who already hold the desired knowledge. This baffles the Outworlder, who sees it only as a source of additional expense. He breaks off their conversation. George is dismayed; the Registered Historian offers condolences.

George is returned to the House and discovers the reality: the House is an Institute of Higher Studies. Those people who have the urge and persistence to create, even though they have been told otherwise about their abilities, are sent there to support the advancement of science and civilization. George has always been under constant observation, and it was subtly but deliberately suggested that he escape and seek out the doctor who sent him there. Reflecting on his experiences "outside," George realizes that a man named Beeman would have to have been the inventor of the Beeman spectrograph. Beeman could not have been Tape-educated and still have created the new device. Someone has to program the Tapes that program the Educated, "men and women with capacity for original thought." George's "keepers" in the Institute are revealed as sociologists, psychologists, historians, scientists, and other professionals who also demonstrated an innate capacity for original thought but not the stamina to keep fighting to express it. Their job is to help other determined innovators like George–a small fraction–to avoid the same fate. The future of society is at stake.

George himself has one final question. He asks, "Why do they call them Olympics?".

== Criticism ==
Profession exemplifies the science fiction trope of the protagonist experiencing ordeals that they seem to have failed but in fact indicate their uniqueness.

Patricia S. Warrick compares humans receiving education entirely from tapes to robots, arguing that Asimov views most people as rigid and machine-like with the true creative mind a rare exception.

The novella inspired a research paper investigating whether people would choose to take a magic learning pill to gain knowledge without 'manual' learning, finding that 57 of 58 participants would replace at least some of their learning experiences with a magic pill.
