= The Petrified Planet =

- Dust-jacket from the first edition
- Author: edited by Fletcher Pratt
- Language: English
- Series: Twayne Triplets
- Genre: Science fiction
- Publisher: Twayne
- Publication date: 1952
- Publication place: United States
- Media type: Print (hardback)
- Pages: 263 pp
- OCLC: 317781825
- Followed by: Witches Three

The Petrified Planet is an anthology of three original science fiction stories, edited by the un-credited Fletcher Pratt and published by Twayne in 1952. It was the first in a series of planned "Twayne Triplets," "a series of books to be produced by the 'joint efforts' of a scientist and a trio of writers." No further editions of the anthology were issued, although each of the stories was later republished.

== Contents ==
- "Introduction", John D. Clark
- "The Long View", Fletcher Pratt (Startling Stories 1952; Wildside Press 2006)
- "Uller Uprising", H. Beam Piper (Uller Uprising, Ace Books 1983)
- "Daughters of Earth", Judith Merril (in Daughters of Earth: Three Novels, Doubleday Books 1969)

== Reception ==
J. Francis McComas reviewed the anthology unfavorably in The New York Times, saying "the book has not the slightest trace of coherence or consistency" and "the stories themselves [do not] come remotely near their authors' usual standards."

In his review, reprinted in In Search of Wonder, Damon Knight faulted the high-concept format: "The trouble is that, no matter how interesting the background may be, there’s probably at most only one dramatic way of using it in a story, and when you toss it up for grabs the best thing that can happen is that one out of three writers will use it effectively. The trouble is, further, that shoehorning the postulated background into three different stories does not unify them but makes them mutually contradictory."
