= The Dead Past =

- Short story by Isaac Asimov
- Country: United States
- Language: English
- Genre: Science fiction

Publication
- Published in: Astounding Science Fiction
- Publication type: Periodical
- Publisher: Street & Smith
- Media type: Print (Magazine, Hardback & Paperback)
- Publication date: April 1956

Chronology
Franchise	Someday

"The Dead Past" is a science fiction short story by American writer Isaac Asimov, first published in the April 1956 issue of Astounding Science Fiction. It was later collected in Earth Is Room Enough (1957) and The Best of Isaac Asimov (1973), and adapted into an episode of the science-fiction television series Out of the Unknown. Its pattern is that of dystopian fiction, but of a subtly nuanced flavor.

== Plot summary ==
Asimov extrapolates the twin trends towards centralization of academic research and scientific specialization, to portray a world in which state control of scientific research is overseen by a vast bureaucracy, and scholars are effectively forbidden from working outside their narrow field of specialization. Working innocently under these constraints is Arnold Potterley, a professor of ancient history. Potterley, an expert on ancient Carthage, wishes to gain access to the chronoscope, a device which allows direct observation of past events, to establish whether the Carthaginians really sacrificed children by fire.

Pioneered by a neutrino physicist named Sterbinski many years before, the chronoscope is now exclusively controlled by the government. When the government bureaucracy, in the person of bureaucrat Thaddeus Araman, denies Potterley's request for chronoscope access, Potterley sets in motion a clandestine research project to build a chronoscope of his own. Two people assist his quest: a young physics researcher named Jonas Foster and the physicist's uncle, a professional (i.e., licensed by the government) science writer, Ralph Nimmo.

As a result of this work, the team makes a series of discoveries. First, they learn that the government has been suppressing research into chronoscopy; nevertheless, through his specialty in physics, Foster invents a way to construct a chronoscope that is much more compact and energy-efficient than that of its pioneer inventor. Though this discovery delights Potterley, Foster soon proves that no chronoscope can see more than about 120 years into the past. In any attempt to observe an earlier time, the inevitable noise totally drowns out the signal. The government's reports of chronoscope observations of earlier years are thus clear fabrications.

Personality conflicts and clashes of motivation cause the team members to fall out with each other. Potterley and his wife both remain disturbed by the death of their baby daughter in a house fire many years earlier, and there is the suggestion that he is subconsciously trying to exonerate the Carthaginians of child sacrifice as a way of exonerating himself of the possibility that he accidentally started the fire which killed his daughter. When he sees his wife's reaction to the chronoscope, and realizes that she would use it to obsessively watch their daughter's short life, he alerts the authorities and accepts the blame. His associate, Foster, now in the grip of intellectual pride and zeal for the cause of free inquiry, attempts to publish his breakthrough but is suddenly and unexpectedly apprehended by Thaddeus Araman, the bureaucrat who rejected Potterley's original research request.

As Araman attempts to secure a promise from Foster not to persist in publication, Foster's uncle, Nimmo, is brought in. Nimmo proves just as rebellious and intractable as the other two, and Araman, frustrated by their unwillingness to cooperate, has no alternative but to declare the government's hand. He reveals that Foster has been apprehended through the government's own use of the chronoscope in snooping on the plotters.

Araman reveals that the government chronoscopy agency, far from suppressing scientific research out of blind authoritarianism, was trying to protect the people in the only way they knew how. As Foster and Potterley have learned, the chronoscope is inherently limited to recent times—but what if, instead of focusing it upon the distant past, it were tuned to the past of one-hundredth of a second ago? The dead past, Araman says, is only a synonym for "the living present". The chronoscope would permit users to watch any person or event they pleased. If the plans for a chronoscope, particularly Foster's accessible version, ever reached the general public, the resulting plague of voyeurism would effectively eliminate the concept of privacy. Even the government workers now assigned to the chronoscope, Araman says, sometimes transgress regulations and use it to spy for personal purposes.

Nimmo then reveals that in an attempt to take the blame off Foster, he has already sent the details of Foster's chronoscope to several of his regular publicity outlets. The details of how to build a chronoscope relatively easily and cheaply are now available to everyone.

Araman is resigned to the exposure of the chronoscope, and leaves the three academics with the insightful line: "Happy goldfish bowl to you, to me, to everyone, and may each of you fry in hell forever. Arrest rescinded."

== Notes ==
- Asimov wrote the story after seven years as a professor at the Boston University School of Medicine. He said in 1973 that he tried to not let his personal life appear in fiction but "The Dead Past" was an exception, such as the scientific-research setting and the protagonist's interest in Carthage.
- In his autobiography In Memory Yet Green, Asimov writes, "The story, one of my favorites, is most memorable to me for what I put in it accidentally. What I was planning was a story that inverted the usual assumption that government planning is tyrannical and that freedom of scientific inquiry is good. In the course of the story, however, I threw in, almost at random, a reference to Carthage that somehow took on a life of its own and quite unexpectedly introduced a subplot that provided the whole course of the story with excellent motivation. Any critic reading the story is bound to conclude I planned that subplot from the beginning, though I swear I didn't."
- The name Araman is similar to the character in the story "The Last Trump", "R. E. Mann" (a pun on Ahriman).
- The Asimov festschrift Foundation's Friends includes a sequel to "The Dead Past" by American science fiction writer Barry N. Malzberg called "The Present Eternal".
- Alex Kozinski referenced the article in a Stanford Law Review article on internet privacy and internet surveillance.
- Asimov made up the science of "neutrinics", the detection and manipulation of the neutrino particle, to explain how the chronoscope functions. Although the existence of the neutrino had been postulated in 1930, the first confirmed report of its detection was published a few months after the story first appeared.
