= Multivac =

Fictional supercomputer by Isaac Asimov

Multivac is a fictional powerful computer appearing in over a dozen science fiction stories by American writer Isaac Asimov during 1955–1983. Asimov depicted Multivac as a mainframe-type computer accessible by terminal, originally by specialists using machine code and later by any user, and used for directing the global economy and humanity's development. Multivac has been described as the direct ancestor of HAL 9000.

== Description ==
Like most of the technologies Asimov describes in his fiction, Multivac's exact specifications vary among appearances. In all cases, it is a government-run computer that answers questions posed using natural language, and it is usually buried deep underground for security purposes. According to his autobiography In Memory Yet Green, Asimov coined the name in imitation of UNIVAC, an early mainframe computer. Asimov wrote that he had unwittingly assumed the name "Univac" denoted a computer with a single vacuum tube (it actually is an acronym for "Universal Automatic Computer"), and called his fictional giant computer "Multivac". His later short story "The Last Question", however, expands the AC suffix to be "analog computer". However, Asimov never settles on a particular size for the computer (except for mentioning it is very large)^{:86} or the supporting facilities around it. In the short story "Franchise" it is described as half a mile long (~800 meters) and three stories high, at least as far as the general public knows, while "All the Troubles of the World" states it fills all of Washington D.C.. There are frequent mentions of corridors and people inside Multivac. Unlike the artificial intelligences portrayed in his Robot series, Multivac's early interface is mechanized and impersonal, consisting of complex command consoles few humans can operate. In "The Last Question", Multivac is shown as having a life of many thousands of years, growing ever more enormous with each section of the story, which can explain its different reported sizes as occurring further down the internal timeline of the overarching story.^{:20}

== Storylines ==
Multivac appeared in over a dozen science fiction stories by American writer Isaac Asimov, some of which have entered the popular imagination. In the early Multivac story, "Franchise", Multivac chooses a single "most representative" person from the population of the United States, whom the computer then interrogates to determine the country's overall orientation. All elected offices are then filled by the candidates the computer calculates as acceptable to the populace. Asimov wrote this story as the logical culmination – and/or possibly the reductio ad absurdum – of UNIVAC's ability to forecast election results from small samples.

In the most famous Multivac story, "The Last Question", the computer is the first in a line of supercomputers that spans ten trillion years, constantly perplexed by the problem of how to reverse the decay of the stars. In solving the problem it ascends to godhood.

In "All the Troubles of the World", the version of Multivac depicted reveals a very unexpected problem. Having had the weight of the whole of humanity's problems on its figurative shoulders for ages it has grown tired, and it sets plans in motion to cause its own death.

== Significance ==
In the opinion of Patricia S. Warrick, Asimov's depiction of Multivac has been seen as the defining conceptualization of the genre of computers for the period, just as his development of robots defined a subsequent generation of thinking machines, and Multivac has been described as the direct ancestor of HAL 9000. Though the technology initially depended on bulky vacuum tubes, the concept – that all information could be contained on computer(s) and accessed from a domestic terminal – constitutes an early reference to the possibility of the Internet (as in "Anniversary"). Multivac has been considered within the context of public access information systems and used in teaching computer science, as well as with regard to the nature of an electoral democracy, as its influence over global democracy and the directed economy increased ("Franchise"). Asimov stories featuring Multivac have also been taught in literature classes. In AI control terms, Multivac has been described as both an "oracle" and a "nanny".

== Bibliography ==
Asimov's stories featuring Multivac:

- "Question" (1955; withdrawn)
- "Franchise" (1955)
- "Someday" (1956)
- "The Last Question" (1956)
- "Jokester" (1956)
- "All the Troubles of the World" (1958)
- "Anniversary" (1959)
- "The Machine That Won the War" (1961)
- "My Son, the Physicist" (1962)
- "Key Item" (1968)
- "The Life and Times of Multivac" (1975)
- "Point of View" (1975)
- "True Love" (1977)
- "It Is Coming" (1979)
- "Potential" (1983)

== See also ==
- AI control problem
- Government by algorithm
- Isaac Asimov short stories bibliography
- List of fictional computers
