= The Complete Stories (Asimov) =

Discontinued series

First edition (volume I) Cover art by Barclay Shaw

The Complete Stories can refer to two different series:

1. The original series that intended to form a definitive collection of Isaac Asimov's short stories and novels. Originally published in 1990 (Volume 1) and 1992 (Volume 2) by Doubleday, it was discontinued after the second book of the planned series. Altogether 88 of Asimov's 384 published short stories and poems are collected in these two volumes.
2. The extended series by HarperVoyager that began by republishing the original series and continued with additional volumes.

== Volume 1 ==
The first volume consists of the stories previously collected in Earth Is Room Enough, Nine Tomorrows, and Nightfall and Other Stories (but not the commentary from Nightfall and Other Stories). In 2001, Broadway Books published a new edition of the first volume (hardback: ISBN 0-385-41606-7, paperback: ISBN 0-385-41627-X). In 2024, it was republished by HarperVoyager as two parts: Living Space and Other Stories (having the first 25 stories) and Nightfall and Other Stories (having the last 23 stories).

Volume One contains the following short stories:

1. The Dead Past
2. The Foundation of S.F. Success
3. Franchise
4. Gimmicks Three
5. Kid Stuff
6. The Watery Place
7. Living Space
8. The Message
9. Satisfaction Guaranteed
10. Hell-Fire
11. The Last Trump
12. The Fun They Had
13. Jokester
14. The Immortal Bard
15. Someday
16. The Author's Ordeal
17. Dreaming Is a Private Thing
18. Profession
19. The Feeling of Power
20. The Dying Night
21. I'm in Marsport Without Hilda
22. The Gentle Vultures
23. All the Troubles of the World
24. Spell My Name with an S
25. The Last Question
26. The Ugly Little Boy
27. Nightfall
28. Green Patches
29. Hostess
30. Breeds There a Man…?
31. C-Chute
32. In a Good Cause—
33. What If—
34. Sally
35. Flies
36. Nobody Here But—
37. It's Such a Beautiful Day
38. Strikebreaker
39. Insert Knob A in Hole B
40. The Up-to-Date Sorcerer
41. Unto the Fourth Generation
42. What Is This Thing Called Love?
43. The Machine That Won the War
44. My Son, the Physicist
45. Eyes Do More Than See
46. Segregationist
47. I Just Make Them Up, See!
48. Rejection Slips

== Volume 2 ==
Volume Two contains short stories previously published in several other anthologies. In 2024, it was republished by HarperVoyager as two parts: The Martian Way and Other Stories (having the first 19 stories and "Obituary") and The Bicentennial Man and Other Stories (having "Anniversary" and the last 19 stories).

Volume 2 contains the following short stories:

1. Not Final!
2. The Hazing
3. Death Sentence
4. Blind Alley
5. Evidence
6. The Red Queen's Race
7. Day of the Hunters
8. The Deep
9. The Martian Way
10. The Monkey's Finger
11. The Singing Bell
12. The Talking Stone
13. Each an Explorer
14. Let's Get Together
15. Pâté de Foie Gras
16. Galley Slave
17. Lenny
18. A Loint of Paw
19. A Statue for Father
20. Anniversary
21. Obituary
22. Rain, Rain, Go Away
23. Star Light
24. Founding Father
25. The Key
26. The Billiard Ball
27. Exile to Hell
28. Key Item
29. Feminine Intuition
30. The Greatest Asset
31. Mirror Image
32. Take a Match
33. Light Verse
34. Stranger In Paradise
35. . . . That Thou Art Mindful of Him
36. The Life and Times of Multivac
37. The Bicentennial Man
38. Marching In
39. Old-fashioned
40. The Tercentenary Incident

== The extended series series by HarperVoyager ==
The Complete Series was extended by two books by HarperVoyager in 2024: Ring Around the Sun and Other Stories and Mother Earth and Other Stories. In 2025 Gold and Magic were republished as part of the series.

Ring Around the Sun and Other Stories contains the following stories:

1. Marooned off Vesta
2. The Callistan Menace
3. Ring Around the Sun
4. The Magnificent Possession
5. Trends
6. The Weapon Too Dreadful to Use
7. Black Friar of the Flame
8. Half-Breed
9. The Secret Sense
10. Homo Sol
11. Half-Breeds on Venus
12. The Imaginary
13. Heredity
14. History
15. Christmas on Ganymede
16. The Little Man on the Subway
17. Super-Neutron
18. Legal Rites
19. Time Pussy
20. No Connection

Mother Earth and Other Stories contains the following stories:

1. The Prime of Life (poem)
2. Mother Earth
3. Darwinian Pool Room
4. Shah Guido G.
5. Button, Button
6. Everest
7. The Pause
8. Let's Not
9. Youth
10. Sucker Bait
11. What's in a Name?
12. The Dust of Death
13. Blank!
14. Silly Asses
15. Buy Jupiter
16. Author! Author!
17. The Proper Study
18. Waterclap
19. 2430 A.D.
20. Thiotimoline to the Stars
21. The Winnowing
22. Birth of a Notion

== See also ==
- Isaac Asimov short stories bibliography
