= Hellfire =

Hellfire may refer to:

== Metaphysical concepts ==
- Fires of Hell
- The lake of fire

== Books ==
- "Hell-Fire", a 1956 science fiction short story by American writer Isaac Asimov
- Hellfire (book), a 2005 history book written by Cameron Forbes
- Hellfire (comics), various characters
- Hellfire, a power of the Ghost Rider comic book character
- "Hellfire" (Nick Tosches book), a 1982 biography of Jerry Lee Lewis by Nick Tosches

== Film and TV ==
- Hellfire (1949 film), a 1949 western
- Hellfire (1995 film), a TV movie produced by Roger Corman
- Hellfire: A Journey from Hiroshima, a 1986 documentary film
- Hell Fire (2012 film), a 2012 horror film
- Hellfire (2026 film), an upcoming action thriller film
- "HellFire", an episode from the first season of MacGyver

== Gaming ==
- Diablo: Hellfire, a 1997 expansion pack to the computer game Diablo from Sierra On-Line
- Hellfire (video game), a 1989 arcade game, later ported to the Mega Drive and PC Engine CD-ROM

== Military ==
- AGM-114 Hellfire, an air-to-surface and surface-to-surface missile system
- Hell-Fire trigger, a device designed to increase the rate of fire of a semi-auto firearm
- Hellfire Corner, location in the Ypres Salient during World War I

== Music ==
- Davey "Hellfire" Kelly, one-time guitarist of the Sonic Boom Six
- Hellfire (1349 album), a 2005 album by Norwegian black metal group 1349
- Hellfire (Black Midi album), a 2022 album by English rock band Black Midi

=== Songs ===
- "Hellfire" (song), a song from the 1996 animated film The Hunchback of Notre Dame
- "Hellfire" (Mango Groove song), a 1989 single by Mango Groove
- "Hellfire", a song from the Soulcalibur II Original Soundtrack (2003)
- "Hellfire", a song from Airbourne's 2008 album Runnin' Wild
- "Hellfire", a song by Fever 333 from the 2024 album Arcane League of Legends: Season 2
- "Hellfire", a song from Gamma Ray's 2005 album Majestic
- "Hellfire", a song from Visions of Atlantis' 2024 album Pirates II – Armada
- "Hellfire", a song from Warkings' 2022 album Morgana
- "Hellfire", a 2017 song by Barns Courtney

== See also ==
- Hellfire preaching
- Hellfire Club (disambiguation)
- Hellfire Pass (disambiguation)
- Lake of Fire (disambiguation)
