= Hurrian (disambiguation) =

Hurrian may refer to:

- Bronze Age:
  - Hurrians, culture of ancient Anatolia/ Northern-Mesopotamia
  - The extinct Hurrian language of the Hurrians
- Fiction:
  - God in Arcanis role-playing game
  - Hurrians, vegetarian primate species in Isaac Asimov story “The Gentle Vultures”
