= The Birth of a Nation (disambiguation) =

The Birth of a Nation may refer to:

- The Birth of a Nation, a 1915 silent film directed by D.W. Griffith (originally titled The Clansman)
- Birth of a Nation (1983 film), a television movie about the British educational system directed by Mike Newell
- The Birth of a Nation (2016 film), a film about Nat Turner directed by Nate Parker
  - The Birth of a Nation: The Inspired By Album, the companion album to the 2016 movie The Birth of a Nation

== See also ==
- Birth of a Notion (disambiguation)
