= It's Such a Beautiful Day =

It's Such a Beautiful Day may refer to:

- It's Such a Beautiful Day (film), a 2012 American experimental animated drama film
- It's Such a Beautiful Day (short story), a short story by Isaac Asimov
