= Buy Jupiter and Other Stories =

1975 collection of short stories by Isaac Asimov

- First edition cover (publ. Doubleday); Cover artist: Michael Flanagan
- Author: Isaac Asimov
- Language: English
- Publisher: Doubleday
- Publication date: 1975
- ISBN: 0-385-05077-1 (first edition)
- Dewey Decimal: 813.54
- LC Class: PZ3.A8316 Bu

Buy Jupiter and Other Stories is a 1975 collection of short stories by American writer Isaac Asimov. Each story is introduced by a short account of how it came to be written and what was happening in Asimov's life at the time, and follows on from where The Early Asimov (1972) left off. In the introduction, Asimov explains that his objective is to tell enough of his autobiography in his short story collections so that his editors will stop asking him to write an actual autobiography. (However he eventually wrote three volumes of autobiography anyway.) The collection was voted 13th in the 1976 Locus Award competition for the Best Single Author Collection.

== Contents ==
The book includes the following stories:

- "Darwinian Pool Room" (1950)
- "Day of the Hunters" (1950)
- "Shah Guido G." (1951)
- "Button, Button" (1953)
- "The Monkey's Finger" (1953)
- "Everest" (1953)
- "The Pause" (1954)
- "Let's Not" (1954)
- "Each an Explorer" (1956)
- "Blank!" (1957)
- "Does a Bee Care?" (1957)
- "Silly Asses" (1958)
- "Buy Jupiter" (1958)
- "A Statue for Father" (1959)
- "Rain, Rain, Go Away" (1959)
- "Founding Father" (1965)
- "Exile to Hell" (1968)
- "Key Item" (1968), Multivac series
- "The Proper Study" (1968)
- "2430 A.D." (1970)
- "The Greatest Asset" (1972)
- "Take a Match" (1972)
- "Thiotimoline to the Stars" (1973), Thiotimoline series #4
- "Light Verse" (1973), Robot series
