= Star Science Fiction Stories No.3 =

- Cover of Star Science Fiction Stories No.3
- Author: Frederik Pohl (editor)
- Language: English
- Series: Star Science Fiction Stories
- Genre: Science fiction
- Publisher: Ballantine Books
- Publication date: January 1955
- Publication place: United States
- Media type: Print (Paperback)
- Preceded by: Star Science Fiction Stories No.2
- Followed by: Star Science Fiction Stories No.4

Star Science Fiction Stories No.3 is a science fiction short story collection, first published in 1955 by Ballantine Books. The third book in the anthology series, Star Science Fiction Stories, edited by Frederik Pohl.

== Contents ==
- "It's Such a Beautiful Day" by Isaac Asimov
- "The Strawberry Window" by Ray Bradbury
- "The Deep Range" by Arthur C. Clarke
- "Alien" by Lester del Rey
- "Foster, You're Dead!" by Philip K. Dick
- "Whatever Happened to Corporal Cuckoo?" by Gerald Kersh
- "Dance of the Dead" by Richard Matheson
- "Any More at Home Like You?" by Chad Oliver
- "The Devil on Salvation Bluff" by Jack Vance
- "Guinevere for Everybody" by Jack Williamson
