= Hellfire Pass (disambiguation) =

Hellfire Pass is a railway cutting and war memorial in Thailand.

Hellfire Pass is also an alternative name for:

- Bwlch y Groes in Wales
- Halfaya Pass in Egypt

== See also ==
- Hellfire (disambiguation)
