= John Berkey =

American artist (1932–2008)

- Born: August 13, 1932; Edgeley, North Dakota, U.S.
- Died: April 29, 2008 (aged 75); Excelsior, Minnesota, U.S.
- Education: Minneapolis School of Art
- Known for: Magazine & book covers, film posters
- Notable work: Poster art for King Kong (1976); Star Wars (1977)
- Movement: Science fiction art
- Awards: Spectrum Award for Grand Master; 1999
- Elected: Society of Illustrators
- Website: www.johnberkey.com

John C. Berkey (August 13, 1932 – April 29, 2008) was an American artist known for his space and science fiction themed works. Some of Berkey's best-known work includes much of the original poster art for the Star Wars trilogy, the poster for the 1976 remake of King Kong and also the "Old Elvis Stamp".

Berkey produced a large body of space fantasy artwork, producing utopian scenes of bubble-shaped, yacht-like spaceships. His distinctive painterly style has been evaluated as "at once realistic, yet impressionistic and abstract", and his space craft designs as being "distinctly elegant, yet clearly technological and unmistakably Berkian; more inspired by luxury yachts and manta rays than NASA". He has been described as "one of the giants in the history of science fiction art".

== Early life ==
John C. Berkey was born in Edgeley, North Dakota, in 1932. Berkey's early childhood was spent in Aberdeen, South Dakota. When he was aged six, he and his family moved to St. Joseph, Montana and then to Excelsior, Minnesota. In 1950, Berkey graduated from high school and went on to study at the Minneapolis School of Art. He resided in Shorewood, Minnesota.

== Career ==
Berkey worked as a freelance artist from the 1960s, after an eight-year stint at Brown & Bigelow, a St. Paul, Minnesota, advertising agency. There, he produced up to seventy calendar paintings a year, which featured historical scenes of the American pioneers, road and railway construction, agricultural and industrial scenes.

=== Book covers & magazines ===
Among other commissions, Berkey regularly produced artwork for magazines such as Popular Mechanics, Omni, Science Fiction Age, Discover, National Geographic, TV Guide and The Plain Truth.

Berkey made his mark in science fiction publishing with his cover art for Ballantine Books' 1972 reprint of the STAR Science Fiction series. Following this success, he went on to design a large number of book covers including works by Isaac Asimov, Ben Bova, Philip K. Dick, Robert Heinlein, Glen Cook and many more. For the 1972 edition of Asimov's novel, The Caves of Steel, Berkey's cover art featured a self-portrait with his arm showing exposed cybernetic mechanics.

=== NASA ===
In the 1960s, Berkey was commissioned by NASA to produce artworks depicting the Apollo space program and other missions, as part of the NASA Art Program. He continued to paint space exploration subjects, including Skylab and the Space Shuttle Challenger disaster.

=== Film work ===
Berkey declined an invitation from Stanley Kubrick to work on the 1968 film 2001: A Space Odyssey. In 1974, Berkey was commissioned to render the key art for The Towering Inferno, which became the largest grossing film of 1974. This established Berkey's reputation and he went on to produce poster artwork for a number of other blockbuster films including the 1976 remake of King Kong, Orca the Killer Whale (1977), Meteor (1979), Black Stallion (1979), Superman III (1983), and Dune (European release, 1984). He also produced promotional artwork for The Concorde... Airport '79 (1979).

=== Star Wars ===
John Berkey's 1976 Star Wars poster

In 1975, the young filmmaker George Lucas purchased several pieces of Berkey's science fiction artwork. The paintings served as visual reference material while Lucas was trying to pitch his ideas to film studios for a new space fantasy film, The Star Wars. Among the paintings was one of a rocket-plane diving down through space towards a gigantic mechanical planet (the image had been used as cover art for the 1972 reprint of the short story anthology Star Science Fiction Stories No.4). It is thought that this painting in particular had a strong influence on the production design of Star Wars and served to inspire the film's leading concept artist, Ralph McQuarrie, and the model maker Colin Cantwell, whose early designs for the Death Star battle station bore a strong similarity to Berkey's painting. A number of other Star Wars spacecraft, such as Star Destroyers, may also have been influenced by Berkey's designs of naval-style ships with smooth hulls and conning towers bristling with antennae.

Berkey was commissioned by Lucasfilm and 20th Century Fox in 1976 to provide some of the first poster art for Star Wars. Among this work was a painting which depicted the character Luke Skywalker brandishing a lightsaber, flanked by Princess Leia Organa the robots C-3PO and R2-D2, and a number of Imperial stormtroopers; in the background is a large figure of Darth Vader looming behind them, a similar composition to the theatrical poster artwork for Star Wars by Tom Jung and the Brothers Hildebrandt. When the novelization of the film was published, Star Wars: From the Adventures of Luke Skywalker, the United Kingdom edition published by Sphere Books featured cover art by Berkey (Ballantine Books' US edition originally featured a cover by Ralph McQuarrie).

Another of Berkey's original paintings for Star Wars was a poster depicting the final battle over the Death Star from the final scenes of the film. Berkey reportedly never saw Star Wars, and this is evidenced in the fact that he illustrated multiple Millennium Falcon spaceships (in the film there is only one). Berkey said of the poster in an interview, "It was the first time that I was asked to paint fictional space crafts not of my own design". The painting was issued as a souvenir poster that was included in the first release of the Star Wars Original Motion Picture Soundtrack by 20th Century Records.

Berkey's involvement in Star Wars was brought to an end after a conflict of interest with his work for rival film studio Universal on the 1978 TV series Battlestar Galactica.

Berkey revisited the Star Wars universe in 1983 when he was commissioned to provide the cover artwork for the Atari video game, Return of the Jedi: Death Star Battle.

=== Postage stamps ===
In 1992, the US Postal Service held a public vote on the design of a new commemorative stamp which was to feature Elvis Presley. Two designs were shortlisted: a younger Elvis by Mark Stutzman, and an older Elvis by John Berkey. Stutzman's "Young Elvis" won the competition with over 75% of the votes. Berkey nevertheless went on to design 15 other postage stamps, including the 1991 Christmas stamp featuring an illustration of Santa Claus.

== Honors and awards ==
In 1999, John Berkey received the Spectrum Award for Grand Master.

In 2004 he was elected to the Society of Illustrators' Hall of Fame. On March 22, 2007, Excelsior, Minnesota, honored him with "John Berkey Day."

John Berkey was Artist Guest of Honor at Minicon 35 in 2000.

== Personal life and death ==
Berkey and his wife, Damaris, lived in Excelsior, Minnesota, and had three children. He died at home on April 29, 2008, at the age of 75.

== Legacy ==
Many of his original paintings have been displayed at ArtOrg in Northfield, Minnesota.

In his lifetime, Berkey influenced a number of artists, especially science fiction artists, among them James Gurney, Drew Struzan, Vincent Di Fate, Stephen Youll, John Picacio, Brandon Peterson and Michael Kaluta.

== See also ==
- Category:Film posters by John Berkey
- Category:Book covers by John Berkey
- Chris Achilleos
- Chris Foss
- Suzy Rice
- Tom Jung
- List of Star Wars artists
