= Hellfire (comics) =

Hellfire, in comics, may refer to:

- Hellfire, a member of the Elementals
- Hellfire (J. T. Slade), the grandson of the Phantom Rider and a member of the Secret Warriors
- Hellfire, the alter ego of Mikal Drakonmegas who has appeared in Terror Inc.
- Hellfire Club (comics), a Marvel Comics supervillain team

== See also ==
- Hellfire (disambiguation)
