= Birth of a Notion =

Birth of a Notion may refer to:

- Birth of a Notion (film), a 1947 Looney Tunes short
- "Birth of a Notion" (short story), by Isaac Asimov
- Birth of a Notion, an album by jazz composer and musician Edward Wilkerson
- "Birth of a Notion", an episode of the Canadian television series Black Harbour
- "The Good, The Bad And The Squishy / Birth Of A Notion", an episode of the animated series Eek! The Cat

== See also ==
- The Birth of a Nation, a landmark early film
