= Nightfall and Other Stories =

Short story collection by Isaac Asimov

- Author: Isaac Asimov
- Cover artist: Amelia S. Edwards
- Language: English
- Genre: Science fiction, short story collection
- Published: 1969
- Publisher: Doubleday
- Publication place: United States
- Pages: 343 (First edition)
- OCLC: 976576102
- Dewey Decimal: 813.54
- LC Class: PS3551.S5 A15 1969

Nightfall and Other Stories (1969) is a collection of 20 previously published science fiction short stories by Isaac Asimov. Asimov added a brief introduction to each story, explaining some aspect of the story's history and/or how it came to be written.

== Background ==
In the introduction for the title story, "Nightfall," Asimov explained that although pleased by the praise it had received, he disliked "being told, over and over again" that a story he had written at the age of 21 was his best. Asimov hoped that the collection would prove that "sheer practice [had] made me more proficient, technically, with each year". He chose successful stories not included before in any anthologies edited by Asimov himself.

== Contents ==
- "Nightfall" (first published in September 1941 issue of Astounding Science Fiction), novelette
- "Green Patches" (first published in November 1950 issue of Galaxy Science Fiction as "Misbegotten Missionary")
- "Hostess" (first published in May 1951 issue of Galaxy Science Fiction), novelette
- "Breeds There a Man...?" (first published in June 1951 issue of Astounding Science Fiction), novelette
- "C-Chute" (first published in October 1951 issue of Galaxy Science Fiction), novelette
- "In a Good Cause—" (first published in New Tales of Space and Time, 1951), novelette
- "What If—" (first published in Summer 1952 issue of Fantastic)
- "Sally" (first published in May/June 1953 issue of Fantastic), Robots series
- "Flies" (first published in June 1953 issue of The Magazine of Fantasy & Science Fiction)
- "Nobody Here But—" (first published in Star Science Fiction Stories, 1953)
- "It's Such a Beautiful Day" (first published in Star Science Fiction Stories #3, 1955), novelette
- "Strikebreaker" (first published in January 1957 issue of The Original Science Fiction Stories as "Male Strikebreaker")
- "Insert Knob A in Hole B" (first published in December 1957 issue of The Magazine of Fantasy & Science Fiction)
- "The Up-to-Date Sorcerer" (first published in July 1958 issue of The Magazine of Fantasy & Science Fiction)
- "Unto the Fourth Generation" (first published in April 1959 issue of The Magazine of Fantasy & Science Fiction)
- "What Is This Thing Called Love?" (first published in March 1961 issue of Amazing Stories as "Playboy and the Slime God")
- "The Machine That Won the War" (first published in October 1961 issue of The Magazine of Fantasy & Science Fiction), Multivac series
- "My Son, the Physicist" (first published in February 1962 issue of Scientific American), Multivac series
- "Eyes Do More Than See" (first published in April 1965 issue of The Magazine of Fantasy & Science Fiction)
- "Segregationist" (first published in Book 4 of Abbottempo, 1967), Robots series
