= Critical Factor =

- Short story by Hal Clement
- Country: United States
- Language: English
- Genre: Science fiction

Publication
- Published in: Star Science Fiction Stories No.2
- Publication type: Anthology
- Publisher: Ballantine Books
- Media type: Print (paperback)
- Publication date: 1953

"Critical Factor" is a science fiction short story by American writer Hal Clement, published in 1953 in Star Science Fiction Stories No.2.

== Plot introduction ==
The story describes the existence and scientific discoveries of a race of sentient rock-dwelling liquid organisms. These creatures literally live within certain types of rock and travel "as ink travels through a blotter". In the course of the plot, the creatures study the nature of air (which they call "the void"), liquids, and gravity from their limited perspective. The creatures can only eat rock that has not been exposed to oxygen. They consider melting the polar ice caps to increase the level of the ocean water, and protecting their edible rock by covering each continent with magma. They ultimately postpone the plan (which would destroy all human life) since they cannot be certain that the ocean levels will rise uniformly due to their limited understanding of non-solid states of matter.
