= Star Science Fiction Stories No.1 =

Anthology series edited by Frederik Pohl

Star Science Fiction Stories
- First edition hardcover
- Editor: Frederik Pohl
- Cover artist: Richard M. Powers (first edition); John Berkey (reprint)
- Language: English
- Series: Star Science Fiction Stories
- Genre: Science fiction, anthology
- Publisher: Ballantine Books
- Publication date: February 1953
- Publication place: United States
- Media type: Hardcover, Mass market paperback
- Pages: 202
- ISBN: 0-345-02717-5 (reprinting)
- Followed by: Star Science Fiction Stories No.2

Star Science Fiction Stories No.1 is the first book in the anthology series Star Science Fiction Stories, edited by Frederik Pohl. It was first published in 1953 by Ballantine Books, without numeration, and was reprinted in 1972 as "No. 1". The book featured the first appearance of Arthur C. Clarke's short story, "The Nine Billion Names of God". These books have been very critically acclaimed by critics around the world.

== Contents ==
- "Country Doctor", William Morrison
- "Dominoes", C. M. Kornbluth
- "Idealist", Lester del Rey
- "The Night He Cried", Fritz Leiber
- "Contraption", Clifford D. Simak
- "The Chronoclasm" (a.k.a. "Chronoclasm"), John Wyndham
- "The Deserter", William Tenn
- "The Man with English", H. L. Gold
- "So Proudly We Hail", Judith Merril
- "A Scent of Sarsaparilla", Ray Bradbury
- "Nobody Here But—", Isaac Asimov
- "The Last Weapon", Robert Sheckley
- "A Wild Surmise", Henry Kuttner and C. L. Moore
- "The Journey", Murray Leinster
- "The Nine Billion Names of God", Arthur C. Clarke

== Anthology series ==
Star Science Fiction Stories was followed by a number of subsequent books in the series, each edited by Frederik Pohl. They were all reprinted in 1972 with new cover art by John Berkey.

- Star Science Fiction Stories No.1 (1953)
- Star Science Fiction Stories No.2 (1953)
- Star Science Fiction Stories No.3 (1955)
- Star Science Fiction Stories No.4 (1958)
- Star Science Fiction Stories No.5 (1959)
- Star Science Fiction Stories No.6 (1959)
