= Does a Bee Care? =

Short story by Isaac Asimov

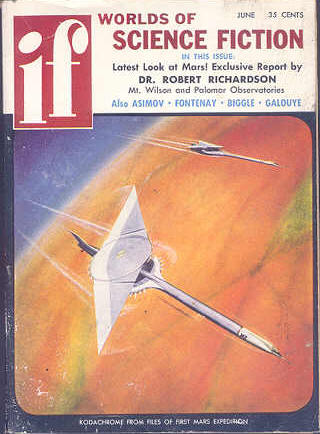
"Does a Bee Care?" was originally published in the June 1957 issue of If.

"Does a Bee Care?" is a science fiction short story by American writer Isaac Asimov. It was first published in If: Worlds of Science Fiction in June 1957, and reprinted in the 1975 collection Buy Jupiter and Other Stories. Gold Key Comics also published a comic book version of the story in 1976 in #4 of the four issue science fiction series Starstream: Adventures in Science Fiction. It also appeared in 1976's Questar: Illustrated Science Fiction Classics, published by Golden Press and adapted by A. Moniz with artwork from Jack Abel and in 1975 in Buy Jupiter and Other Stories.

== Plot summary ==
An ovum is deposited on pre-human Earth by an alien race and in due course it gives birth to a creature that takes the form of a human. Over the centuries, the creature lives amongst humans and mentally influences certain of them to advance the development of civilization. In particular, it works on scientists and eventually it causes the development of space travel. As the first spaceship to attempt to reach the Moon is being built, the creature, now known as Kane, causes the creation of a small space in the ship, which he enters, unknown to the builders.

The ship leaves Earth and at the appropriate point, Kane departs from the ship and, now fully developed, travels unaided to its home planet.

The author draws an analogy between Kane and a bee that visits and thereby pollinates flowers at random, with no real knowledge of what it has done.

== Comic adaptation plot summary ==
The illustrated adaptation by Moniz and Abel differs from the original short in that the comic is told largely from the perspective of the rocket scientist, Dr. Hammer, who is introduced as he struggles with an impossible math problem related to an upcoming launch. On several occasions, stargazing janitor Kane causes the frustrated doctor to have a sudden epiphany which allows him to progress in the launch effort. After realizing Kane is always around when he has these moments of insight, Hammer confronts Kane and learns of Kane's 8,000 year history of "assisting" scientists and inventors to make historic breakthroughs – all apparently to advance humanity's effort into exploring space. Unexpectedly, Kane himself does not have any understanding of how or why he has been doing this, nor familiarity with the scientific breakthroughs he's inspired. Kane feels compelled to enter the special man-sized room Dr. Hammer had inadvertently designed in the rocket just before launch, and once arriving in open space, transforms into his adult alien form.

== See also ==
- The character of Kane (Command & Conquer) has been inspired by this story, bearing the same name and having a similar story arc.
