= The Dying Night =

- Short story by Isaac Asimov
- Country: United States
- Language: English
- Genre: Science fiction mystery short story

Publication
- Published in: Fantasy and Science Fiction
- Publication type: Periodical
- Publisher: Fantasy House
- Media type: Print (Magazine, Hardback & Paperback)
- Publication date: July 1956

Chronology
- Series: Wendell Urth
The Talking Stone	The Dust of Death

"The Dying Night" is a science fiction short story by American writer Isaac Asimov. The story first appeared in the July 1956 issue of The Magazine of Fantasy & Science Fiction, and was reprinted in the collections Nine Tomorrows (1959), Asimov's Mysteries (1968), and The Best of Isaac Asimov (1973). "The Dying Night" is Asimov's third Wendell Urth story.

== Plot summary ==
Three astronomers, who have been working on the Moon, Mercury and the asteroid Ceres, meet for the first time in ten years at a convention on Earth. They also meet a former colleague of theirs, Romero Villiers, who had to stay on Earth because of illness. Villiers claims to have invented a mass-transference/teleportation device, but dies under suspicious circumstances before he can demonstrate the device to his friends.

Another scientist who has seen the device demonstrated suspects that Villiers has been murdered by one of his classmates, and he questions them. In the course of his investigation, a photographic record of a research paper by Villiers describing his theory is discovered on a windowsill of the room, but is found to have been ruined through exposure to sunlight.

When none of the suspects admits any guilt, Wendell Urth, an eccentric scientist who has had success in investigating crimes, is brought in. He identifies the guilty astronomer as the one who has been on Mercury. The key lies in the idea (at the time of writing believed to be true) that Mercury has one face always pointing away from the Sun. The guilty party had hidden the film in what he thought was a safe place because he subconsciously expected the night to last forever.

Since the story was written, it has been discovered that Mercury is not tidally locked (a fact Asimov noted when the story appeared in subsequent anthologies printed after this advance in scientific knowledge). A Mercurian sidereal day is 58.6 Earth days long, while its solar day is as much as 176 days, due to a 3:2 spin resonance compared to its year at 88 days.

== References to other stories ==
In this story, the motive for murder was the teleportation device. Asimov noted that in his other Wendell Urth story, "The Singing Bell", travel by teleportation was regarded as routine. He dismissed this inconsistency with his favorite epithet, "Emerson!", a reference to Ralph Waldo Emerson's dictum "A foolish consistency is the hobgoblin of little minds." In-universe, the inconsistency can possibly be explained by Romero's invention actually being a way to teleport living beings, since in "The Singing Bell" the teleportation is only used for transporting inert cargo (with humans taking regular transport), while Romero explicitly states he managed to teleport a mouse. Teleportation and FTL transportation are shown to be a more difficult task with living beings than inert cargo in numerous works of science fiction, including Asimov's own short story "Risk".
