= The Foundation of S.F. Success =

Poem by Isaac Asimov

"The Foundation of S.F. Success" is a 1954 poem by American writer Isaac Asimov, which pastiches the patter song "If you're anxious for to shine" from the Gilbert and Sullivan comic opera Patience. It describes the easy way to become a successful writer. Asimov borrows Gilbert's rhythm and rhyme schemes. The poem includes the lines: "With a tiny bit of cribbin' from the works of Edward Gibbon and that Greek, Thucydides", in which Asimov is lampooning himself, referring to the inspiration for the Foundation novels. It was the first poem that Asimov ever sold.

The piece was first published in The Magazine of Fantasy and Science Fiction in October 1954. It was later included in Asimov's short story collection Earth Is Room Enough (1957) and his The Complete Stories, vol. 1 (1990).

== See also ==
- "The Author's Ordeal"
