= Earth Is Room Enough =

Short story collection by Isaac Asimov

- Dust-jacket from the first edition
- Author: Isaac Asimov
- Cover artist: Tony Palladino
- Language: English
- Genre: Science fiction
- Publisher: Doubleday
- Publication date: October 3, 1957
- Publication place: United States
- Media type: Print (hardback & paperback)
- Pages: 192
- ISBN: 0-586-01042-4 (later edition)
- Preceded by: The Martian Way and Other Stories
- Followed by: Nine Tomorrows

Earth Is Room Enough is a collection of fifteen short science fiction and fantasy stories and two pieces of comic verse by American writer Isaac Asimov, published in 1957. In his autobiography In Joy Still Felt, Asimov wrote, "I was still thinking of the remarks of reviewers such as George O. Smith... concerning my penchant for wandering over the Galaxy. I therefore picked stories that took place on Earth and called the book Earth Is Room Enough." The collection includes one story from the Robot series and four stories that feature or mention the fictional computer Multivac.

It formed the first half of The Complete Stories, Volume 1, published in 1990. In 2024, it was republished by HarperVoyager as the first half of Living Space and Other Stories.

== Contents ==
- "The Dead Past" (1956), novelette, a Multivac story
- "The Foundation of S.F. Success" (1954), poem
- "Franchise" (1955), a Multivac story
- "Gimmicks Three" (1956)
- "Kid Stuff" (1953)
- "The Watery Place" (1956)
- "Living Space" (1956)
- "The Message" (1955)
- "Satisfaction Guaranteed" (1951), a Susan Calvin robot story
- "Hell-Fire" (1956)
- "The Last Trump" (1955)
- "The Fun They Had" (1951)
- "Jokester" (1956), a Multivac story
- "The Immortal Bard" (1953)
- "Someday" (1956), a Robots and Multivac story
- "The Author's Ordeal" (1957), poem
- "Dreaming Is a Private Thing" (1955)

== Sources ==
- Tuck, Donald H. (1974). The Encyclopedia of Science Fiction and Fantasy. Chicago: Advent. p. 21. ISBN 0-911682-20-1.
