= The Gentle Vultures =

- Short story by Isaac Asimov
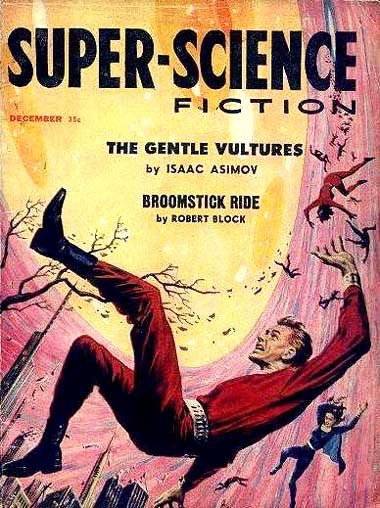
- Country: United States
- Language: English
- Genre: Science fiction

Publication
- Published in: Super-Science Fiction
- Publication type: Periodical
- Publisher: Headline Publications
- Media type: Print (Magazine, Hardback & Paperback)
- Publication date: December 1957

"The Gentle Vultures" is a science fiction short story by American writer Isaac Asimov. The story first appeared in the December 1957 issue of Super-Science Fiction, and was reprinted in the 1959 collection Nine Tomorrows.

The story is one of a number that Asimov wrote expressing his abhorrence of the Cold War nuclear arms race, but its lightly ironic flavor has earned it more positive critical responses than those drawn by the bitter moralism of "Silly Asses" and "Darwinian Pool Room".

== Plot summary ==
The Hurrians, a small, tailed, vegetarian primate species have found on their space travels that large, non-tailed omnivorous intelligent ape species always end up destroying themselves in a nuclear war. The Hurrians adopted the policy of helping to rebuild the remnants of these planetary societies after their nuclear wars, while genetically modifying the inhabitants into more peaceful races. They are not acting completely selflessly, either: as is discovered in the subsequent conversation with a captured human, each race "helped" in this fashion pays the Hurrians a "modest" contribution, choosing the product that this race is best at. In one case, an otherwise poor race pays in its own members, by forfeiting a set number of individuals into servitude each year.

The Hurrians learned of Earth at the beginning of the Cold War but were surprised that an atomic war did not immediately develop. They establish a base on the Moon to wait for Earth's civilization to destroy itself. However, despite their calculations, after fifteen years the war has not come. The Hurrians cannot simply leave either: their calculations indicate that if the people of Earth do not destroy their civilization, they will soon develop space travel and, presumably because of their violence, quickly set chaos among the Hurrians' civilization.

In desperation, the Hurrians kidnap a human to try to discover why the nuclear war has not happened. The human taunts the Hurrians by calling them vultures, since the Hurrians never try to prevent the nuclear wars, but wait for them to occur and then assist the survivors. After conversing with the human and analyzing his conversation, the Hurrians reach an astounding conclusion. As the inspector, who came to supervise such an unusual case, tells to the resident director of the base, the war will not start by itself; it needs to be "helped". Refusing to understand the meaning of the word, the director fearfully asks for clarification, and is told that the Hurrians need to drop an atomic bomb themselves, in order to initiate the conflict which will then escalate on its own. Such a method, while computed to be the only way to start the war, and thus prevent the destruction of advanced space civilizations, is nevertheless completely unacceptable to the Hurrians, a race of absolute pacifists who cannot envision killing a sentient being.

Even though such an act is needed, explains the director, it simply cannot be done, for no Hurrian will be able to drop the bomb himself, or even order someone else to do so. Unable to solve this dilemma, the Hurrians are forced to return home, plagued by the visions of humans conquering space.

== Reception ==
Algis Budrys said that the "gentle story, told by a gentle man" was "not quite enough. For the reader is very liable to say: 'True. Too true. Now what?'"
