= Time to Come =

1954 anthology of science fiction and fantasy stories edited by August Derleth

- Dust-jacket from the first edition
- Editor: August Derleth
- Language: English
- Genre: Science fiction, fantasy
- Publisher: Farrar, Straus and Young
- Publication date: April 1954
- Publication place: United States
- Media type: Print (hardback)
- Pages: 311

Time to Come is an anthology of science fiction and fantasy stories edited by American writer August Derleth. It was first published by Farrar, Straus and Young in 1954. The stories are all original to this anthology.

== Contents ==
- Foreword, by August Derleth
- "Butch", by Poul Anderson
- "The Pause", by Isaac Asimov
- "Keeper of the Dream", by Charles Beaumont
- "No Morning After", by Arthur C. Clarke
- "The Blight", by Arthur J. Cox
- "Hole in the Sky", by Irving Cox, Jr.
- "Jon’s World", by Philip K. Dick
- "The White Pinnacle", by Carl Jacobi
- "Winner Take All", by Ross Rocklynne
- "Paradise II", by Robert Sheckley
- "Phoenix", by Clark Ashton Smith
- "BAXBR/DAXBR", by Evelyn E. Smith

== Sources ==
- Contento, William G. "Index to Science Fiction Anthologies and Collections". Archived from the original on 2007-03-16.
- Tuck, Donald H. (1974). The Encyclopedia of Science Fiction and Fantasy. Chicago: Advent. p. 140. ISBN 0-911682-20-1.
- Time to Come title listing at the Internet Speculative Fiction Database
