= Star Science Fiction Stories No.2 =

- Cover of Star Science Fiction Stories No.2
- Author: various
- Cover artist: Richard M. Powers
- Language: English
- Series: Star Science Fiction Stories
- Genre: Science fiction, anthology
- Publisher: Ballantine Books
- Publication date: 1953
- Publication place: United States
- Media type: Print
- Preceded by: Star Science Fiction Stories No.1
- Followed by: Star Science Fiction Stories No.3

Star Science Fiction Stories No.2 is the second book in the anthology series, Star Science Fiction Stories, edited by Frederik Pohl. The book featured the first appearance of Jerome Bixby's short story, "It's a Good Life". It was first published in 1953 by Ballantine Books.

== Contents ==
- "Disappearing Act" by Alfred Bester
- "The Clinic" by Theodore Sturgeon
- "The Congruent People" by Algis Budrys
- "Critical Factor" by Hal Clement
- "It's a Good Life" by Jerome Bixby
- "A Pound of Cure" by Lester del Rey
- "The Purple Fields" by Robert Crane
- "F Y I" by James Blish
- "Conquest" by Anthony Boucher
- "Hormones" by Fletcher Pratt
- "The Odor of Thought" by Robert Sheckley
- "The Happiest Creature" by Jack Williamson
- "The Remorseful" by C.M. Kornbluth
- "Friend of the Family" by Richard Wilson

== Reception ==
P. Schuyler Miller reviewed the anthology favorably, reported that many of the stories were "as good as you'll find anywhere."
