= Hell-Fire =

- Short story by Isaac Asimov
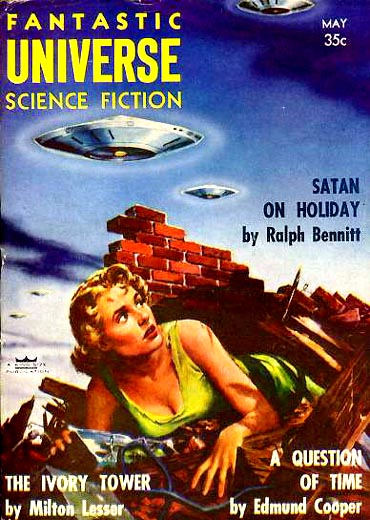
- Country: United States
- Language: English
- Genre: Science fiction

Publication
- Published in: Fantastic Universe
- Publication type: Periodical
- Publisher: King-Size Publications
- Media type: Print (magazine, hardback, paperback)
- Publication date: May 1956

"Hell-Fire" is a science fiction short story by American writer Isaac Asimov, originally published in the May 1956 issue of Fantastic Universe and reprinted in the 1957 collection Earth Is Room Enough. It is one of a number of stories, such as "Darwinian Pool Room" and "Silly Asses", in which Asimov worries about the nuclear arms race of the 1950s.

== Plot summary ==
"Hell-Fire" is an extremely short story, and deals with a journalist, Alvin Horner, who speaks with Joseph Vincenzo, a scientist at Los Alamos, at the first exhibition of a film with super-slow-motion footage of a nuclear explosion, with the footage "divided into billionth-second snaps." Vincenzo is sure that nuclear bombs are hell-fire, and tells the journalist they shall ultimately destroy mankind.

After the scientist's observations, the film starts. For a brief moment, before initiating the full reaction into the infamous nuclear toadstool, the atomic blast resembles a specific shape: the face of the Devil.
