= The Author's Ordeal =

"The Author's Ordeal" are lyrics to a song by American author Isaac Asimov. They were first published in Science Fiction Quarterly, May 1957, pp. 34–36. They are included in three collections of Asimov's short stories: Earth Is Room Enough, The Far Ends of Time and Earth (omnibus edition) and The Complete Stories, vol. 1.

The lyrics pastiche the Gilbert and Sullivan patter song known as "the (Lord Chancellor's) Nightmare Song" from Iolanthe. The song depicts the agonies he goes through in thinking up a new science fiction story. It notes that the process of devising a space opera is incompatible with living in the real world with all its "dull facts of life that hound you".

== See also ==
- "The Foundation of S.F. Success"
