= Insert Knob A in Hole B =

"Insert Knob A in Hole B" is a science fiction short story by Isaac Asimov. The story was first published in the December 1957 issue of The Magazine of Fantasy and Science Fiction and reprinted in the 1969 collection Nightfall and Other Stories.

The story is unusually short, totalling just 350 words, and arose from a televised panel discussion that Asimov took part in on 21 August 1957. During the panel discussion, Asimov was challenged to write a story on the spot. He accepted, and this story is the result. Asimov later admitted to some preparation prior to the interview, as he suspected that other panel members might make such a request.

== Plot summary ==
Two men on a remote space station receive all of their equipment from Earth unassembled, and must assemble it with only vague and confusing instructions ("composed by an idiot", one says); as a result, it often fails to work properly or at all. They eagerly await the arrival of a sophisticated positronic robot that will repair existing equipment and assemble new ones.

Upon its arrival, they discover that the robot has been shipped in 500 pieces with vague, confusing assembly instructions.
