= The Message (short story) =

- Short story by Isaac Asimov
- Country: U.S.
- Language: English
- Genre: Science fiction

Publication
- Published in: The Magazine of Fantasy and Science Fiction
- Publisher: Fantasy House
- Media type: Magazine
- Publication date: February 1956

"The Message" is a science fiction short story by American writer Isaac Asimov. It was first published in the February 1956 issue of The Magazine of Fantasy and Science Fiction and reprinted in the 1957 collection Earth Is Room Enough. "The Message" provides a fanciful origin of the expression "Kilroy was here". A very short story, it contains only 579 words.

== Plot summary ==
George Kilroy, a 30th-century historian, briefly travels in time to the twentieth century to research the life of the Second World War foot soldier. He arrives in North Africa as soldiers are landing on the beaches of Oran, and before leaving, he makes his mark on the wall of a hut.
