= Each an Explorer =

Short story by Isaac Asimov

"Each an Explorer" is a science fiction short story by American writer Isaac Asimov. It was written in June 1956 and first published in issue #30 of Future Science Fiction. It was also reprinted in the 1975 collection Buy Jupiter and Other Stories.

== Plot summary ==
The story focuses on Chouns and Smith, two members of the "Exploration Teams", who are charged with exploring for new planets, especially those that are potentially habitable by humans. Whilst temporarily without their hyperspace drive, which has apparently broken down, they land on a planet with Earth-like gravity and atmosphere, and find an advanced agricultural civilization, with grain-like plants tended by short four-legged beings.

The beings show the two visitors hyperspatial sighters (valuable instruments for galactic navigation), despite the planet never having been visited by humans before. They indicate that more of the instruments are to be found on the neighbouring planet and the explorers leave in a hurry to visit it, never stopping to consider the impossibility of the situation. On the second planet, they meet aquatic snake-like creatures who offer them more sighters.

Back in the spaceship, Chouns, who is known for his 'hunches', eventually realizes what's happened; that they've been telepathically 'conditioned' to transfer pollen from the plants (who are the real masters) on one planet to the other. The telepathic control of the plants coerced them into doing this by making them believe that two small rocks were actually valuable and that there would be more on the other planet. Chouns believes that he must immediately warn Earth of this threat, as he also realizes that one of the two animal species must have at one time been capable of interplanetary travel. However, the plants must have considered the technology of that civilization to be a threat and used their telepathy to destroy the perceived threat.

But what neither man realizes is that when they return to Earth they will bring spores with them to establish the plants on Earth as the potentially controlling intelligence.
