= What Is This Thing Called Love? (short story) =

- Short story by Isaac Asimov
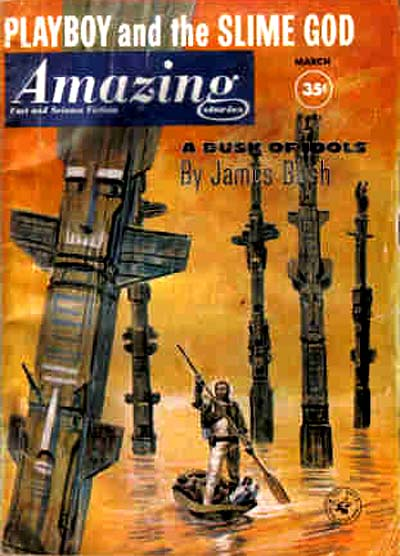
- Country: United States
- Language: English
- Genre: Science fiction

Publication
- Published in: Amazing Stories
- Publication type: Periodical
- Publisher: Ziff-Davis
- Media type: Print (Magazine)
- Publication date: March 1961

"What Is This Thing Called Love?" is a science fiction short story by American writer Isaac Asimov. The story was requested by Cele Goldsmith Lalli, editor of Amazing Stories, as a satire of an article in Playboy called "Girls of the Slime God" which had suggested that pulp science fiction stories were concerned with aliens and sex. The story appeared in the March 1961 issue of Amazing as "Playboy and the Slime God", but Asimov later retitled it "What Is This Thing Called Love?"

== Writing ==
According to Asimov, in "1938-39 ... for some half a dozen issues or so, a magazine I won't name" published "spicy" stories about "the hot passion of alien monsters for Earthwomen. Clothes were always getting ripped off and breasts were described in a variety of elliptical phrases" for its "few readers" before "the magazine died a deserved death". The magazine in question was Marvel Science Stories (later Marvel Tales), which was published from 1938–41. In 1960, an article by William Knowles for Playboy on the pulp era, was published called "Girls of the Slime God". The article proposed — not too seriously — that pulp science fiction stories were concerned with aliens and sex. According to Asimov, the article was mostly based on Marvel since its contents had been the raciest.

Cele Goldsmith Lalli, editor of Amazing Stories, requested a satire of the Playboy article. Asimov set out to write a story telling how a sex-interested alien and humans might really interact. The story appeared in the March 1961 issue of Amazing as "Playboy and the Slime God", but when Asimov included it in his 1969 collection Nightfall and Other Stories he retitled it "What Is This Thing Called Love?" Goldsmith Lalli rewrote the story's last three paragraphs, a change Asimov regarded as a great improvement, and which he kept.

== Plot synopsis ==
Non-human aliens from the other end of the Galaxy visit Earth and kidnap two humans, a man and a woman. They take them up from the surface to their spaceship and question them about human interaction and methods of human reproduction, which is quite different from theirs. The aliens reproduce asexually and the head researcher on humans regards sexual reproduction as an unstable trait that would make humanity very dangerous and worthy of extermination. However, it has trouble convincing the rest of the aliens, who cannot imagine two different sexes within the same species, nor the possibility of genes from two different individuals combining.

Predictably, the humans react with great indignation when requested to demonstrate human reproduction, and the aliens finally give up on their research and return the humans to Earth. As the aliens return to their planet, the two humans find themselves attracted to each other, and wind up engaging in reproductive activities after all. The alien researcher monitors them remotely and watches the process, but the alien spaceship jumps through space and breaks the monitoring before it can show the results to the rest of the alien crew.
