= Star Science Fiction Stories No.4 =

Star Science Fiction Stories
- Cover art of the 1972 edition
- Author: various edited by Frederik Pohl
- Cover artist: Richard M. Powers (first edition); John Berkey (1972 reprint)
- Language: English
- Series: Star Science Fiction Stories
- Genre: Science fiction, anthology
- Publisher: Ballantine Books
- Publication date: November 1958
- Publication place: United States
- Media type: Hardcover, Mass market paperback
- Pages: 157
- ISBN: 978-0-345-02720-7 (reprinting)
- Preceded by: Star Science Fiction Stories No.3
- Followed by: Star Science Fiction Stories No.5

Star Science Fiction Stories No.4 is the fourth book in the anthology series, Star Science Fiction Stories, edited by Frederik Pohl. It was first published in 1958 by Ballantine Books, and was reprinted in 1972. These books have been very critically acclaimed by critics around the world.

Among the stories is James E. Gunn's "The Immortals", about a test car driver who discovers he can live forever. It was adapted into a television movie in 1969, and a TV series in 1970, both entitled The Immortal. Gunn also expanded the material into a novel, The Immortals. Fellow author Isaac Asimov joked to Gunn that the story must have been autobiographical, on account of Gunn's youthful looks.

== Cover art ==
The first edition of Star Science Fiction Stories No.4 featured semi-abstract cover art by Richard M. Powers.

The cover art that featured on the 1972 reprint was painted by the noted speculative fiction artist John Berkey. It depicted a rocket-plane diving down through space towards a gigantic mechanical planet, and was rotated 180°. Berkey's original artwork was purchased by a young George Lucas to serve as visual reference material while he was trying to pitch his ideas to film studios for a new film, The Star Wars. It is thought that this painting had a strong influence on the eventual production design of Star Wars and served to inspire the film's leading concept artist, Ralph McQuarrie, and model maker Colin Cantwell, whose early designs for the Death Star battle station bore a strong similarity to Berkey's painting of a metal world.

== Contents ==
- "A Pinch of Stardust" by Frederik Pohl
- "A Cross of Centuries" by Henry Kuttner
- "The Advent on Channel Twelve" by C. M. Kornbluth
- "Space-Time for Springers" ("Gummitch the Cat") by Fritz Leiber
- "Man Working" by Richard Wilson
- "Helping Hand" by Lester del Rey
- "The Long Echo" by Miriam Allen deFord
- "Tomorrow's Gift" by Edmund Cooper
- "Idiot Stick" by Damon Knight
- "The Immortals" by James E. Gunn
