= The Up-to-Date Sorcerer =

- Short story by Isaac Asimov
- Country: United States
- Language: English
- Genre: Science fiction

Publication
- Published in: Magazine of Fantasy and Science Fiction
- Publisher: Mercury Press
- Media type: Print (Magazine)
- Publication date: July 1958

"The Up-to-Date Sorcerer" is a science fiction short story by American writer Isaac Asimov. It was first published in the July 1958 issue of Magazine of Fantasy and Science Fiction and reprinted in the 1969 collection Nightfall and Other Stories.

Requested and encouraged by editor Anthony Boucher, the story is a deliberate attempt by the author to write something humorous that incorporates Asimov's love of the complex yet logical plots of the Gilbert and Sullivan operas. It consists largely of a series of puns on their opera The Sorcerer.

Quotes from Gilbert and Sullivan operas occur frequently in Asimov's stories; also in some of his verses explaining how he thinks up new plots for his stories. The words "up-to-date" in the title refer to the titles of musical burlesques of the 1880s and early 1890s like Faust up to date. In 1894, also, George Augustus Sala wrote a book called London Up to Date.

== Plot summary ==
Professor Wellington Johns, an endocrinologist, experiments with a love philtre (which he terms his amatogenic cortical principle), that causes those who take it to fall helplessly in love with the first person they see. Johns' students, Alice Sanger and Alexander Dexter, become entangled in philtre-induced promises of marriage.

The narrator theorizes that the ending to The Sorcerer was not the original one, but was forced on Gilbert by Victorian mores. Instead of the title character in The Sorcerer breaking the spell by yielding his life to Ahrimanes, the narrator believes that originally Gilbert intended that the spell would be broken by the couples marrying, since married couples only seem to argue (in the opera, the love philtre has no effect on married people). This solution, however, would have been offensive to Victorians. The narrator proposes that the couples affected by the philtre marry, which should cancel the effect. He is proven correct, and the couples are free to have the marriages annulled so that they can marry their true loves.
