= The Pause (story) =

Short story by Isaac Asimov

"The Pause" is a science fiction short story by American writer Isaac Asimov. It was first published in August Derleth's 1954 anthology Time to Come and reprinted in the 1975 collection Buy Jupiter and Other Stories.

== Plot summary ==
Alexander Johannison, a nuclear physicist working at the United States Atomic Energy Commission, is mystified when his Geiger counter starts failing to detect radioactivity. Over a period of time, his colleagues also notice the same strange events, but when he finally reports them to his boss, no one will take him seriously, and he realises that he is the only one who is still aware of the existence of radioactivity.

Thinking that maybe an enemy has removed all knowledge of nuclear energy and nuclear weapons and is about to invade the United States, he goes home and finds a stranger there talking to his wife. The stranger, who looks like an impossibly perfect human, explains that he is an entity from 'outside the universe'. He has been assigned to perform an 'operation' on humanity to save them from a potential nuclear holocaust. As part of the operation, all knowledge of radioactivity has been removed from humanity for five years. Also, all radioactive elements no longer exist. After the pause, about one hundred people, including Johannison, will have the task of re-educating humanity in the peaceful use of nuclear power.

The story ends on a sinister note, as, in discussing the visit with his wife, Johannison points out that the visitor at one point referred to the Earth as "the yard", mistakenly using its own context in the reference rather than ours. Johannison concludes that it regards the Earth as a "barnyard" and humans as mere cattle who have to be controlled.
