= Let's Not =

1954 short story by Isaac Asimov

"Let's Not" is a science fiction short story by American writer Isaac Asimov. It was first published in Boston University Graduate Journal in December 1954. It was written for no payment as a favor to the journal, and later appeared in the 1975 collection Buy Jupiter and Other Stories.

== Plot summary ==
Two scientists, who have taken refuge below the surface of Mars together with a hundred others, discuss what Earth used to be like before it was destroyed by nuclear war. They hope to re-establish their teaching and in time repopulate the dead radioactive surface of Earth.
