= Hostess (short story) =

1951 science-fiction short story by Isaac Asimov

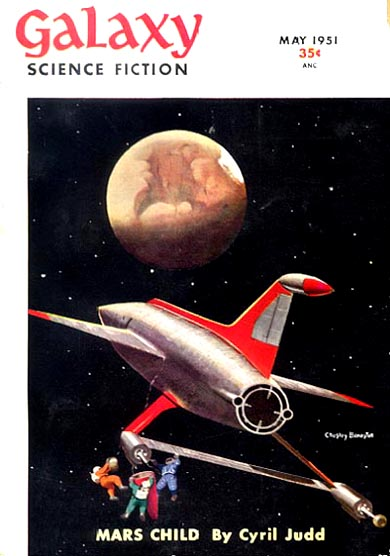
"Hostess" was published in the May 1951 issue of Galaxy Science Fiction

"Hostess" is a science fiction short story by American writer Isaac Asimov. It was first published in the May 1951 issue of Galaxy Science Fiction and reprinted in the 1969 collection Nightfall and Other Stories and Robot Dreams.

The story involves an alien medical doctor who visits Earth as part of research into the unique fact that only Earth beings age and die. His idea of why this happens is proven true in an unexpected way.

== Plot summary ==
Humanity has met four other intelligent non-human races. While the other four races share many similarities, humans are unique among the five races in many ways.

Harg Tholan, a medical researcher from Hawkin's Planet, visits Earth to work at the Jenkins Institute for the Natural Sciences. Research biologist Rose Smollett offers to host him in her home. Her new husband Drake, a member of the World Security Board, dislikes Tholan's presence.

During dinner conversation, Tholan explains that he is investigating "Inhibition Death". The alien lists several unique things about humans: they are the only sentient race to eat meat, they lack any sort of telepathic ability, and to the Smolletts' great surprise, they are the only race to routinely die of old age. Tholan reveals that the other races normally live indefinitely, growing at an ever-slowing rate over time, like Earth trees. Inhibition Death stops the growth, leading to death in a human-like way. He says that the disease has become much more common since travel between Earth and other planets began, and planets closest to Earth suffer the highest rates.

Tholan asks Drake if he can be given a tour of a Missing Person's Bureau. The alien is intrigued by the idea, as the telepathy between members of other races makes missing people impossible. Drake agrees to take him to a police station the next day.

That night, Drake tells Rose that Tholan had asked about him before the visit, and implies that he is there to see him, not Rose. The next day, Rose reads some of Tholan's work which causes her to abandon the notion that he is an imposter. She considers whether the disease was created on Earth as a biological weapon, but rejects it as impossible, given humans' lack of understanding of alien physiology. Thinking of her recent marriage, she wonders if Drake married her to meet Tholan, but rejects this as the timing was not possible. Reviewing the dinner conversation, she remembers Drake's seemingly overreaction to Tholan's polite mention of what a good hostess she was.

At home, Rose mentions her research to Drake. He asks if Tholan has published any conclusions on how the disease spreads; he has not. Drake immediately confronts Tholan with a weapon. Tholan admits that he has come to a conclusion about the cause of the disease, but his research methods are repugnant to other Hawkinsites, so he had to keep it secret. He explains that the disease has been on Earth for millions of years, and higher animals live with it within their DNA (Note: This story was written almost two decades before the discovery of reverse transcriptase, making it particularly forward thinking.) as a sort of parasite. Humans are now partially immune to its effects, but eventually succumb. To spread, the disease controls human behavior, urging males—especially those in the first year of marriage—to have wanderlust so they can infect new hosts. Tholan notes that with the development of interstellar travel, almost all missing persons have fled to space.

After Tholan admits that he has told no one else of the theory, Drake kills him. He says he did this to avoid interstellar war, as the other races would attack Earth to destroy the parasites. Rose realizes that he and the Security Board had to have been aware of Tholan's theory already. She notes Drake's reaction to Tholan's use of the term "hostess" and her offhand mention of mosquitos, carriers of disease. Drake admits that they are indeed aware of the disease, but can do nothing; it now lives in a symbiotic relationship with humans, its growth-inhibiting properties preventing cancer from killing everyone. Drake leaves with the body.

As she waits for him to return, Rose realizes Drake is lying. The disease cannot inhibit cancer, because children get cancer while still growing, before the disease has expressed itself. She realizes the real action of the disease: There are two forms and they need to mix genes before producing a form that spreads to aliens. This is why Drake married her; they carried the two different forms and the disease was mating. Rose realizes that her husband will never return.

== Adaptations ==
"Hostess" was adapted for radio in the anthology series X Minus One, first broadcast on December 12, 1956.
