= The Last Trump =

1955 short story by Isaac Asimov

- Short story by Isaac Asimov
- Country: United States
- Language: English
- Genre: Science fiction

Publication
- Published in: Fantastic Universe
- Publication type: Periodical
- Publisher: King-Size Publications
- Media type: Print (Magazine, Hardback & Paperback)
- Publication date: June 1955

"The Last Trump" is a science fiction short story by American writer Isaac Asimov. It was first published in the June 1955 issue of Fantastic Universe and reprinted in the 1957 collection Earth Is Room Enough. Although humorous, it deals among other things with a serious subject, calendar reform. The title is a reference to 1 Corinthians 15:52.

== Plot summary ==
By order of the Council of Ascendants and approved of by the Chief, it is decided that the Day of Resurrection is due on Earth, despite the protestations of Etheriel, a junior Seraph with responsibility for the world. Whilst he seeks an audience with the Chief to plead for a stay of execution for "his" planet, the Last Trump is sounded, and as of January 1, 1957, time comes to a stop on Earth.

A mysterious figure known only as R. E. Mann (a pun on Ahriman, the Persian name for Satan)—later revealed as the devil—makes his way across the world, seeing what has happened in the Hereafter and pleased with it. All the dead are coming back to life, naked and uncaring. He meets a former professor of history who observes that the people have indeed been judged and are not in heaven but hell. He also meets a manufacturer of breakfast cereal, who angrily threatens to sue, since no one will need his product any more.

Etheriel has his meeting with the Chief and argues that the date January 1, 1957, unqualified, is meaningless, and that therefore a single Day of Resurrection is also impossible. The Chief agrees and declares that the end will come only when all the peoples of the Earth agree on a common date (which, given the wide variety of cultures on Earth, is extremely unlikely to ever occur). The world is instantly restored to normality.

R. E. Mann, frustrated in his endeavours, plans to promote the adoption of a new calendar system, based on the Atomic Era, to begin on December 2, 1944.

== Critical response ==
Peter S. Rieth describes the story as "a rather sorrowful account of the resurrection of the dead and one angel's valiant attempt to stop the end of the world", and says that "Asimov litters his story with a large quantity of simple, day-to-day practical examples of how our wildest hope (resurrection and eternal life) may in practice become a waking nightmare."
