= Kid Stuff =

1953 short science fiction story

- Short story by Isaac Asimov
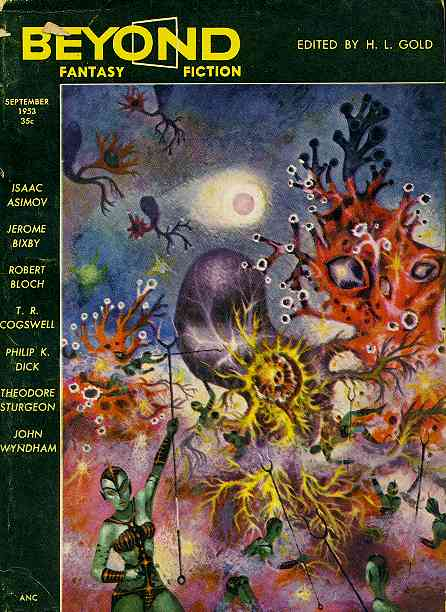
- Country: United States
- Language: English
- Genre: Science fiction

Publication
- Published in: Beyond Fantasy Fiction
- Publication type: Periodical
- Publisher: Galaxy Publishing
- Media type: Print (Magazine, Hardback & Paperback)
- Publication date: September 1953

"Kid Stuff" is a science fiction short story by American writer Isaac Asimov. It was first published in the September 1953 issue of Beyond Fantasy Fiction and reprinted in the 1957 collection Earth Is Room Enough. Asimov wrote the story in January 1953, intending it for a new magazine called Fantastic, but it was rejected by its editor, Harold Browne. Asimov then submitted it to H. L. Gold, who accepted it for a new sister magazine of Galaxy Science Fiction called Beyond Fantasy Fiction.

== Plot summary ==
Jan Prentiss, a fantasy writer is busy at work, when a foot-long talking insect materialises before him. He declares that he is an elf, and is in fact a mutant—a "super-elf"—with new powers that he is still experimenting with. Most of his kind are telepathic. During the last ice age, they used human brains as "psychic amplifiers" to augment their own abilities. However, since the Industrial Revolution, the elves and other related beings have avoided mankind, since they are unable to manipulate electricity, and have retreated to Avalon, an island in the Atlantic Ocean cloaked in a psychic shield.

Prentiss' elf, however, can manipulate electricity and possibly fission uranium. It needs to use Prentiss' brain as a psychic amplifier though, since Prentiss, being a fantasy writer, is one of the few humans with a mind sympathetic enough for the elf to control. When Prentiss balks at being taken to Avalon as an 'advisor', the elf threatens Prentiss' wife and ten-year-old son with physical harm.

Prentiss' son comes home from school, and the elf tries to take control of his mind, too; but the boy, being a modern 1950s child, doesn't believe in "kid stuff" like fairies. The elf is unable to control both minds, and the boy crushes the elf with his schoolbooks.
