= The Dust of Death =

- Short story by Isaac Asimov
- Country: United States
- Language: English
- Genre: Science fiction mystery

Publication
- Published in: Venture
- Publication type: Periodical
- Publisher: Fantasy House
- Media type: Print (Magazine, Hardback & Paperback)
- Publication date: January 1957

Chronology
- Series: Wendell Urth
"The Dying Night"	"The Key"

"The Dust of Death" is a science fiction/mystery short story by American writer Isaac Asimov, first published in the January 1957 issue of Venture Science Fiction Magazine and reprinted in the 1968 collection Asimov's Mysteries.

== Plot summary ==
The Great Llewes (as he is invariably known) is an organic chemist who runs the successful firm of Central Organic Laboratories with an iron fist and a tendency to take credit for his employees' work. The employees at Central Organic spend a lot of time fantasizing about killing Llewes, but one of them finally decides to do it. Edmund Farley has just spent half a year setting up an industrial-scale chemical plant in the hydrogen/methane atmosphere of Titan, and now Llewes is taking the credit for that as well.

On Space Day, the anniversary of the first successful space flight, Farley sneaks into Llewes's atmosphere room and coats the inside of the nozzle of a compressed-gas cylinder with platinum black (finely powdered platinum). Only after he finishes does he realize that he chose the wrong cylinder. Fortunately (for him) he has enough powdered platinum left to booby-trap the correct cylinder. The next morning, Llewes is fatally injured in an explosion.

As Farley's co-worker Jim Gorham inspects the wreckage of the atmosphere room with H. Seton Davenport of the Terrestrial Bureau of Investigation, he is convinced that the explosion could not have been an accident; Llewes was too safety-conscious for that. Davenport notices that the cylinder of compressed hydrogen is lying on the floor empty, and he asks Gorham whether there is a way to cause hydrogen to explode. Gorham tells him there are several catalysts that could cause hydrogen to react explosively with atmospheric oxygen, with platinum black at the top of the list. Gorham analyses the residue on the lip of the cylinder's nozzle and finds traces of platinum, but not enough to be certain. Davenport then has the rest of the cylinders inspected and finds powdered platinum in the nozzle of the oxygen cylinder. Gorham is puzzled by this; the murderer would not have put it in the oxygen cylinder on purpose, but he can't imagine why he would have done so accidentally, unless...

Gorham realizes then that Farley must be the murderer. Six months working in Titan's hydrogen/methane atmosphere had accustomed Farley to using jets of oxygen to create combustion. He had booby-trapped the oxygen cylinder from force of recent habit, then realized his mistake and also booby-trapped the hydrogen cylinder. Davenport is convinced, and orders Farley's arrest.

== Story notes ==
The author originally intended for "The Dust of Death" to be a fourth Wendell Urth story, but since it was due to appear in the premier issue of Venture and the Wendell Urth stories had all appeared in The Magazine of Fantasy and Science Fiction, he decided to remove Urth. The story does feature agent H. Seton Davenport, who appeared in the first two Urth stories. When Asimov prepared the story for inclusion in Asimov's Mysteries, he considered restoring Urth, but, as he put it, "inertia rose triumphant over all".

In line with accepted astronomical knowledge when the story was written, Asimov describes Titan as having an atmosphere composed of hydrogen and methane. Subsequent observations by the Voyager and Cassini spacecraft have since established that the majority of Titan's atmosphere is actually nitrogen.
