= Button, Button (Asimov short story) =

Short story by Isaac Asimov

- Author: Isaac Asimov
- Language: English
- Genre: Science fiction
- Publication date: 1953
- Publication place: United States

"Button, Button" is a science fiction short story by American writer Isaac Asimov. The story first appeared in a January 1953 issue of Startling Stories and was reprinted in the 1975 collection Buy Jupiter and Other Stories. It is one of several stories by Asimov in which he deliberately set out to be funny.

== Plot summary ==
Otto Schlemmelmayer, an eccentric professor, develops a method of linking brain power to creating physical effects. When his effect is modified to create weapons of war, he turns in disgust to the real love of his life - creating a flute that can be played by mental power alone.

To raise the capital required for this project, he colludes with his nephew Harry Smith — a less-than-ethical lawyer and the story's narrator — to use another new invention of his that can reach back into time and retrieve objects (a theme also appearing in "The Ugly Little Boy" and "A Statue for Father").

They plan to retrieve a signature of one of the signatories of the United States Declaration of Independence, Button Gwinnett, which is rare and therefore potentially valuable. The signature is successfully recovered. The experiment works and they present a piece of genuine parchment with a genuine signature to the government for authentication. The scheme fails when the government investigators decide that the parchment is too new to be genuine; because it skipped forward hundreds of years in time, the parchment scrap appears only a year or two old.
