= C-Chute =

1951 science fiction short story by Isaac Asimov

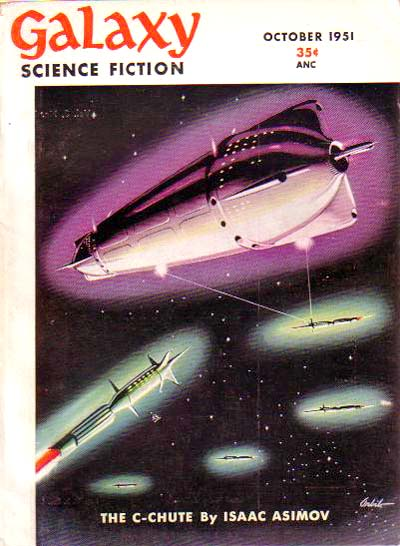
- Author: Isaac Asimov
- Language: English
- Genre: Science fiction
- Publication date: October 1951
- Publication place: United States

"C-Chute" is a science fiction short story by American writer Isaac Asimov. It was first published in the October 1951 issue of Galaxy Magazine and later appeared in Asimov's collections Nightfall and Other Stories (1969) and The Best of Isaac Asimov (1973).

One of the few Asimov stories that feature aliens, the story deals with a group of people imprisoned by an alien race when their spaceship is captured. The emphasis of the story is on the interactions and group psychology of the prisoners, all of whom have differing backgrounds and motivations.

An argument between Asimov and the editor Horace L. Gold over this story was the inspiration for Asimov's story "The Monkey's Finger".

== Plot summary ==
During Earth's first interstellar war, a civilian transport traveling to Earth is captured by the Kloros, a chlorine-breathing race of intelligent beings. The ship is commandeered by two Kloros, along with six human civilians as prisoners of war. The humans cannot agree on what they should do, some even coming to blows. Opinions range from a violent counteroffensive to passive acceptance of their situation. Stuart, who has previously spent time as a guest of the Kloros, where he was provided with prosthetic hands when his own were damaged in an accident, posits that the Kloros are masters of chemistry (thus easily able to maintain an atmosphere and provide food for the captives) but less proficient at engineering, hence prefer to steal human ships to use in the war.

Only Mullen, a shy, mild-mannered, short bookkeeper, is willing to make an attempt to take back control of the ship, which he does by exiting via the C-Chute (short for "casualty chute", normally used for launching corpses for burial in space) and entering the control room via the navigational steam-tubes. He kills the two Kloros by spraying them with oxygen.

An unlikely hero, Mullen admits that he was not motivated by bravery, anger, or fear, but rather homesickness for Earth (specifically his hometown, Richmond, Virginia), which he has not seen for 17 years, and that he could not face the prospect of waiting out the war in captivity when on the cusp of returning home.

== Notes ==
Asimov wrote "C-Chute" at the start of what he in 1973 called his "'mature' period", when he "was full of self-confidence" from having earned his PhD, working as a professor at Boston University School of Medicine", publishing three books, and being no longer dependent on Astounding Science Fiction for his fiction.

"C-Chute" was adapted for radio in the anthology series X Minus One, first broadcast on February 8, 1956.
