= A Statue for Father =

- Short story by Isaac Asimov
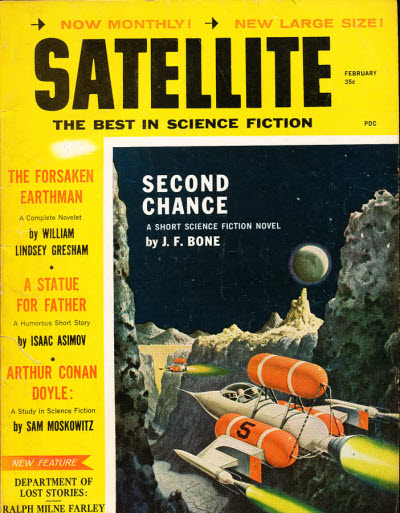
- Language: English
- Genres: Science Fiction, Humor

Publication
- Published in: Satellite Science Fiction, February 1959
- Publication type: Magazine
- Media type: Short story

"A Statue for Father" is a science fiction short story by American writer Isaac Asimov. The story first appeared in the February 1959 issue of Satellite Science Fiction and was reprinted in the 1975 collection Buy Jupiter and Other Stories.

== Plot summary ==
A theoretical physicist and his son work on the theory of time travel, and experiment with a method of reaching back into time and retrieving objects (as also occurs in "The Ugly Little Boy" and "Button, Button").

More by serendipity than design, they manage to retrieve a nest of dinosaur eggs which in due course hatch. They keep on working but are unable to repeat the experiment. In the meantime, the dinosaurs grow and are kept as pets. But when one of them accidentally gets electrocuted, they can't resist tasting the flesh beneath the scales and find that it tastes delicious.

The two men decide to raise the dinosaurs to be killed for food and open the first of a successful chain of restaurants dedicated to serving "dinachicken.".

The ironic twist of the title is that the physicist is remembered not for his scientific achievements, but for his culinary discovery.
