= Take a Match =

1972 science fiction short story by Isaac Asimov

"Take a Match" is a science fiction short story by American writer Isaac Asimov. It was first published in Robert Silverberg's 1972 anthology New Dimensions II and reprinted in the 1975 Asimov collection Buy Jupiter and Other Stories.

== Plot summary ==
An interstellar spaceship is stranded between the stars, but out of reach of the interstellar gases that the drive requires as fuel (the drive technology is not fully explained but is possibly similar to a Bussard Ramjet). It is surrounded by clouds that contain that required fuel, but with excessive quantities of impurities that can't be filtered out.

Anton Viluekis, the Fusionist, a highly sensitive (and eccentric) individual who is in charge of the ship's power, is unwilling to try any alternative methods of gathering fuel, as failure will reflect badly on his reputation. The crew cannot persuade him otherwise.

Louis Martand, a schoolteacher travelling as a passenger, suspects what the trouble is and realises, from his experience of teaching children, that there is an alternative; that of utilising the 'primitive' technology of chemical combustion. He manages to convey his idea via Cheryl Winter, a pretty female passenger, to the fusionist, who successfully tries it.

The teacher is confined to his quarters by the ship's captain, somewhat apologetically, and warned that he will receive no credit; it must be believed that the fusionist was responsible for the success.
