= Buy Jupiter =

1958 short story by Isaac Asimov

"Buy Jupiter!" is a humorous science fiction short story by American writer Isaac Asimov. It was first published in the May 1958 issue of Venture Science Fiction Magazine, and reprinted in the 1975 collection Buy Jupiter and Other Stories. The original title of the story was "It Pays," though it was never published under this name.

== Plot summary ==
Government officials of the Terrestrial Federation negotiate to sell the planet Jupiter to an energy-based alien race. The beings refuse to reveal their plans for its use and whether or not they are at war with other similar beings. Eventually, the aliens reveal that they wish to suspend letters in Jupiter's atmosphere as an advertising slogan (i.e. Jupiter is to be used as an advertising billboard), to be seen by passing spacecraft. The main Earth negotiator reveals to his colleagues that he has outsmarted the aliens, who clearly are not experienced hagglers, having neglected the other Jovian planets. So when rival beings come to do business, Saturn, with its fancy rings, can be sold for an even higher price.
