= The Greatest Asset =

- Short story by Isaac Asimov
- Country: United States
- Language: English
- Genre: Science fiction

Publication
- Published in: Analog Science Fiction and Fact
- Publication type: Periodical
- Publisher: Conde Nast
- Media type: Print (Magazine, Hardback & Paperback)
- Publication date: January 1972

"The Greatest Asset" is a science fiction short story by American writer Isaac Asimov. It was written as a counterpoint to his story "2430 A.D." with the intention of refuting, rather than illustrating, the same quotation by writer and social commentator J. B. Priestley from his 1957 book Thoughts in the Wilderness. It was published in the January 1972 issue of Analog and reprinted in the 1975 collection Buy Jupiter and Other Stories.

The quotation by Priestley runs:

Between midnight and dawn, when sleep will not come and all the old wounds begin to ache, I often have a nightmare vision of a future world in which there are billions of people, all numbered and registered, with not a gleam of genius anywhere, not an original mind, a rich personality, on the whole packed globe.

"2430 A.D." had been commissioned by Think, the house magazine of IBM, but was rejected because it confirmed Priestley's quote. Think requested another story refuting the quote. The rejection of "2430 A.D." came when Asimov's marriage to his first wife was coming to an end. On July 3, 1970, he moved out of his house in West Newton, Massachusetts and took up residence in the Cromwell Hotel in New York City. After settling in, Asimov felt the need to write something, to prove to himself that the disruption of his life had not impaired his writing ability. Thus, on July 8, he wrote "The Greatest Asset", mailing it to Think the following day. On July 22 Asimov received word that Think had rejected "The Greatest Asset" and would, instead, be running "2430 A.D.". Having the first piece of writing he produced after moving to New York rejected came as a blow to Asimov. On July 27 he visited John W. Campbell, editor of Analog magazine, and told him of Think's rejection of "The Greatest Asset". Campbell told him that his own needs and judgment were different from Think's and asked to see the story. Within a week Campbell accepted it, and "The Greatest Asset" appeared in the January 1972 issue of Analog.

== Plot summary ==
The action takes place on a future Earth that has established a totally controlled and balanced ecology. The Secretary-General of Ecology, Ino Adrastus, controls all the ecology with the aid of massive computers. He is visited by Jan Marley, a science writer, to whom Adrastus claims to be no more than a clerk whose sole task is to sign the directives produced by the computers.

Marley is invited to witness a meeting between Adrastus and Lou Tansonia, a medical researcher from the Moon colony, whose proposal involving setting up experimental ecologies has been rejected by the computers.

After Tansonia explains his proposal, Adrastus approves it against the recommendation of the computers. This leads Marley to think that he was there specifically to witness this act. After Tansonia leaves, Adrastus explains to Marley that a common saying attributed to Adrastus is slightly misquoted as "Man's Greatest Asset is a balanced ecology," whereas it should say that "Man's greatest need is a balanced ecology. Man's greatest asset is the unsettled mind." This is because unsettled minds are a necessary prerequisite for "man to be man – which is more important than merely to live." Adrastus is then revealed to have almost certainly engineered this encounter to correct this misattribution.
