= The Watery Place =

- Short story by Isaac Asimov
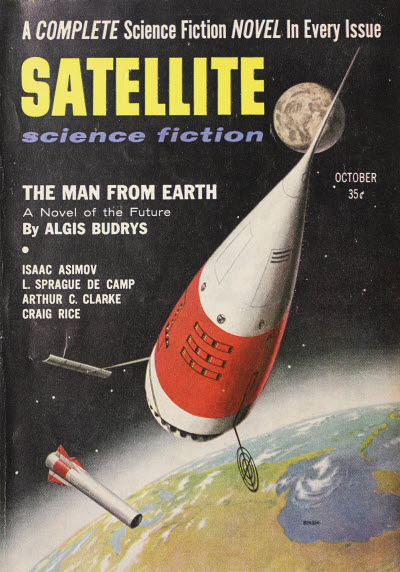
- Country: United States
- Language: English
- Genre: Science fiction

Publication
- Published in: Satellite Science Fiction
- Publisher: Renown Publications
- Media type: Magazine
- Publication date: October 1956

"The Watery Place" is a science fiction short story by American writer Isaac Asimov. It was first published in the October 1956 issue of Satellite Science Fiction and reprinted in the 1957 collection Earth Is Room Enough. It is Asimov's only science fiction story set in Idaho.

== Plot summary ==
"The Watery Place" is narrated by the unnamed deputy sheriff of Twin Gulch, Idaho, who opens the story by explaining that humanity will never achieve space travel. This, he says, is due to his boss, Sheriff Bart Cameron. The deputy explains that Cameron is an impatient man generally, and becomes particularly impatient when he's working on his income taxes. It was the world's bad fortune that the first extraterrestrials to land on Earth happened to arrive in Twin Gulch, Idaho on the evening of 14 April 1956.

The deputy sees a flying saucer land while staring out the window of the sheriff's office, and sees the two occupants approach. The aliens look perfectly human, and are dressed in ordinary business suits. The deputy notes, "I would have thought they were city fellows if I hadn't seen the flying saucer land in the scrub." Cameron is too busy working on his taxes to notice the landing.

The aliens enter and explain to Cameron that they have chosen to make first contact with humanity in Twin Gulch because it is isolated and peaceful, and that they have chosen Cameron to make first contact with because he is the local leader. "We come from the watery place your people call Venus." They want Cameron's help contacting the leaders of the United States of America.

This sets Cameron off. He storms at them, calls them wise-guy jerks, and threatens to lock them up for disturbing the peace. He finishes by saying, "Get the hell out of here and back to wherever you're from and don't ever come back. I don't want to see you and no one else around here does." The alien can tell that Cameron is serious, so he says that he will leave, and see to it that nobody ever returns and that Cameron's people will never have to leave. The deputy can tell that he means it, and that humanity will be fenced in on Earth forever.

After the aliens leave, the outraged deputy drags Cameron over to the window and makes him watch as the flying saucer takes off. He asks why Cameron sent them away. When Cameron says he thought they were just foreigners, the deputy reminds him that they said they were from Venus. Cameron responds, "Venus! When they talked about the watery place, I thought they meant Venice!"
