= Shah Guido G. =

1951 short story by Isaac Asimov

"Shah Guido G." is a science fiction short story by American writer Isaac Asimov. It was first published in the November 1951 issue of Marvel Science Fiction and reprinted in the 1975 collection Buy Jupiter and Other Stories, where Asimov explains his love of puns. It is an example of a shaggy dog story, as indicated by the title ("ShahGui doG").

== Plot summary ==
Shah Guido G. is the nickname of Guido Garshthavastra, the hereditary Secretary-General of the United Nations ("Sekjen"), a tyrant who rules the Earth from a levitating island called Atlantis.

Philo Plat is an aristocrat who secretly plots Shah Guido G.'s downfall. When he learns that the stations that power the Sky-Island's anti-gravitational beams are close to critical, Plat convinces Shah Guido G. to order in a division of Waves (female shock-troops whose name derives from the WAVES of the United States Navy) to put down a supposed rebellion by the technicians.

As Plat suspected, the weight of the Waves' cruisers is sufficient to overload the Sky-Island's power generators, causing it to plummet to the ground, thereby liberating the people from tyranny. The story ends with the punning punchline: "Why, once more in history, Atlantis sank beneath the Waves."

== Editions ==
- Asimov, Isaac, Buy Jupiter and Other Stories, Fawcett Crest, New York, 1975, pp. 33–44. In his background notes on page 42, Asimov himself defines the tale as a shaggy dog story, and lets the reader in on the "Shahgui (shaggy) Dog" pun in the title.

== See also ==
- Shaggy dog story
