= Strikebreaker (short story) =

- Short story by Isaac Asimov
- Country: United States
- Language: English
- Genre: Science fiction

Publication
- Published in: The Original Science Fiction Stories
- Media type: Magazine
- Publication date: January 1957

"Strikebreaker" is a science fiction short story by American writer Isaac Asimov. It was first published in the January 1957 issue of The Original Science Fiction Stories under the title "Male Strikebreaker" and reprinted in the 1969 collection Nightfall and Other Stories under the original title "Strikebreaker". Asimov has stated that the editorial decision to run the story as "Male Strikebreaker" "represents my personal record for stupid title changes".

"Strikebreaker" originated in June 1956 when Asimov, who then lived in Boston, Massachusetts, was planning a trip to New York City. A group of some three dozen technicians was threatening to go on strike, which would shut down the New York City Subway system. The threatened strike did not happen, and Asimov made the trip, but the situation inspired him to write a story about a strike by a single man that would shut down an entire world.

== Plot summary ==
The world of Elsevere is an extrasolar planetoid a hundred miles in diameter. It is home to an insular, idiosyncratic human colony of thirty thousand people, who have inhabited the planet in all three dimensions. A rigid caste system has developed, with each occupation being confined to a particular set of families. A visiting Earth sociologist, Steven Lamorak, learns that Igor Ragusnik has gone on strike.

The Ragusnik family operates Elsevere's waste processing facility and, over the generations, the Ragusniks have become a one-family caste of untouchables, forbidden all contact with the rest of the colony. Igor Ragusnik demands that his family's isolation end. Elsevere's ruling council refuses his demands and, if the strike continues, the planetoid's waste processing machinery will break down and every colonist will die from disease. Although the machinery is not difficult to operate, the taboo is so strong that no other Elseverean will do so.

Only Lamorak is willing to speak to Ragusnik. As neither side will give in, he reluctantly volunteers to operate the waste processing machinery himself; as an outsider, he has no cultural reservations about doing so. Realizing that the ruling council can always import a strikebreaker, Ragusnik capitulates and returns to work.

Lamorak assures Ragusnik that now that other Elseverians and the rest of the galaxy are aware of how unhappy he is, they will eventually end his family's isolation; Ragusnik is unimpressed. Lamorak then attempts to shake Ragusnik's hand, saying it would be an "honor." Ragusnik replies "I would not shake yours," implying that his help as strikebreaker and role in dehumanizing Ragusnik and his family makes him untouchable.

Lamorak learns that he must leave immediately, as other Elseverians will no longer have anything to do with him. Now that he has worked at Ragusnik's job, he is an untouchable himself.
