= The Proper Study =

- Short story by Isaac Asimov
- Country: United States
- Language: English
- Genre: Science fiction

Publication
- Published in: Boys' Life
- Publication date: September 1968

"The Proper Study" is a science fiction short story by American writer Isaac Asimov. Inspired by a painting of a head surrounded by random psychedelic designs, it was commissioned by Boys' Life, and published in the September 1968 issue. (The other story commissioned for the picture was The Faun. by Poul Anderson.) The Proper Study was reprinted in the 1975 collection Buy Jupiter and Other Stories.

The title is taken from a quote by Alexander Pope ("The proper study of mankind is man.").

== Plot summary ==
In a future world where the United States is ruled by a military dictatorship, Professor Oscar Harding is experimenting with a technique he terms neurophotoscopy, by means of which brain wave patterns can be observed as colored effects that appear in the air around the subject and can be examined and analyzed.

In his efforts to have the project declassified and removed from military control, Harding invites the ruling general to visit and observe the experiments. As he plans, the general is mentally affected by the effects he observes, and in a moment of mental weakness agrees to declassify the project.

Before the effect wears off, as it must, Harding arranges for project details to be sent out to news media worldwide, thereby allowing other researchers to begin the proper study of mankind.
