= Everest (short story) =

1953 short story by Isaac Asimov

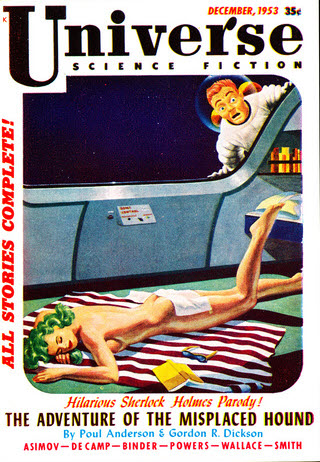
"Everest" was published in the December 1953 issue of Universe Science Fiction.

"Everest" is a science fiction short story by American writer Isaac Asimov. It was first published in the December 1953 issue of Universe Science Fiction and reprinted in the 1975 collection Buy Jupiter and Other Stories. Asimov wrote the story in one sitting while visiting the Chicago, Illinois editorial offices of Universe on 7 April 1953.

In the summary of Buy Jupiter and Other Stories, Asimov claims he frequently used this story to show how poor he was at predicting the future: Everest was successfully climbed in May 1953, and the story (although written in April 1953) did not appear in print until December of that year, meaning Asimov predicted Everest would never be conquered seven months after it was.

== Plot summary ==
The story concerns a mountain climber named James Abram Robbons who is the first man to reach the summit of Mount Everest, after having been dropped there by airplane. Robbons is picked up again two weeks later, and he reports that the summit of Everest is the location of a Martian outpost, and that the yeti are actually Martians.
