= The Monkey's Finger =

Short story by Isaac Asimov

"The Monkey's Finger" is a science fiction short story by Isaac Asimov. It was first published in the February 1953 issue of Startling Stories and reprinted in the 1975 collection Buy Jupiter and Other Stories. The story is based on a disagreement between Asimov and editor H. L. Gold over the story "C-Chute". The title is a reference to W. W. Jacobs' story "The Monkey's Paw".

== Plot summary ==
Marmie Tallinn, a science fiction author, is trying to convince his publisher Lemuel Hoskins to accept a newly written short story. Hoskins wants Tallinn to add a flashback, which Tallinn insists will ruin the pacing of the story and the emotion of its ending; he claims he has scientific proof that he's right.

Tallinn and Hoskins visit Dr. Torgesson, who has used cybernetic modification to give a capuchin monkey the ability to reference all of human literature and extrapolate optimal writing from a fragment of a literary work. Torgesson shows them a version of Hamlet typed by the monkey; it has written "take arms against a host of troubles" instead of "against a sea of troubles", which Torgesson argues is an improvement to Shakespeare because the original uses a mixed metaphor. As a test, Hoskins recites a fragment of Chesterton's Lepanto, and the monkey types the next few lines of the piece as originally written.

The monkey is then given Tallinn's unfinished story to consider; it finishes the story exactly as the editor requested, inserting a scene change where Tallinn wanted to leave it out. Tallinn declares this as proof of his point: Shakespeare's original wording "sea of troubles" is superior because a human knows when to break the rules of writing to tell a better story, and stories written by a machine will be mechanical and lack emotional impact. When Hoskins objects, Tallinn asks him if he thinks machines would be better editors, too. Hoskins gives in and agrees to accept the original story, without the flashback, and to not tell anyone about the existence of the monkey.

The professor later asks Tallinn what he would have done if the monkey had reproduced Tallinn's version of the story. Tallinn sheepishly reveals that that was exactly what he expected would happen.
