= Lake of Fire (disambiguation) =

The lake of fire is a religious after-death concept.

Lake of Fire may also refer to:

- Lake of Fire (album), a 2006 album by Shaye
- Lake of Fire (film), a 2006 documentary film about abortion
- "Lake of Fire" (song), a song by the Meat Puppets and covered by Nirvana
- "Lake of Fire", a song by Nocturnus from their 1990 album The Key
- "Lake of Fire", a song by Boondox from his 2006 album The Harvest
- "The Lake of Fire", a song by Macabre from their 2020 album Carnival of Killers
- Batman/Punisher: Lake of Fire, a 1994 crossover comic book published by DC Comics and Marvel Comics

== See also ==
- "Fire Lake"
- Fire in the Lake
