= The Talking Stone =

Science fiction mystery short story by Isaac Asimov

- Short story by Isaac Asimov
- Country: United States
- Language: English
- Genre: Science fiction

Publication
- Published in: Fantasy and Science Fiction
- Publication type: Periodical
- Publisher: Fantasy House
- Media type: Print (Magazine, Hardback & Paperback)
- Publication date: October 1955

Chronology
- Series: Wendell Urth
The Singing Bell	The Dying Night

"The Talking Stone" is a science fiction mystery short story by American writer Isaac Asimov which first appeared in the October 1955 issue of The Magazine of Fantasy and Science Fiction and was reprinted in the 1968 collection Asimov's Mysteries. "The Talking Stone" was the second of Asimov's Wendell Urth stories.

== Plot summary ==
Larry Verdansky, a repair technician assigned alone on Station Five, is interested in "siliconies", the silicon-based life forms found on some asteroids. The creatures typically grow to a maximum size of 2 inches (5 cm) by absorbing gamma rays from radioactive ores. Some are telepathic.

When the space freighter Robert Q appears at the station with a giant of a "silicony" 1 foot (30 cm) in diameter, Verdansky deduces that the crew has found an incredibly rich source of uranium. Verdansky contacts the authorities, but before a patrol ship can reach her, the Robert Q is hit by a meteor, killing the three human crew members. The silicony itself is fatally injured from the explosive decompression.

When questioned, the dying silicony states that the coordinates of its home are written on "the asteroid". Dr. Wendell Urth deduces that the silicony meant that the numbers were actually engraved on the hull of the Robert Q, disguised as serial and registration numbers, since the ship fit the definition of an asteroid (a small body orbiting the Sun) the ship's crew had read to it from an ancient astronomy book.

== Reception ==
Asimov received fan mail, some of which criticized him "for allowing it [the silicony] to die in so cold-blooded a fashion". He conceded, "I showed a lack of sensitivity to the silicony's rather pathetic death because I was concentrating on his mysterious last words."
