= Dreaming Is a Private Thing =

- Short story by Isaac Asimov
- Country: United States
- Language: English
- Genre: Science fiction

Publication
- Published in: The Magazine of Fantasy and Science Fiction
- Publication type: Periodical
- Publisher: Fantasy House
- Media type: Print (Magazine)
- Publication date: December 1955

"Dreaming Is a Private Thing" is a science fiction short story by American writer Isaac Asimov, first published in the December 1955 issue of The Magazine of Fantasy and Science Fiction and reprinted in the 1957 collection Earth Is Room Enough. Asimov's original title for the story was "A Hundred Million Dreams at Once", but F&SF editor Anthony Boucher changed it. Asimov liked the new title and decided to keep it.

== Plot summary ==
Jesse Weill is founder and owner of Dreams Inc, a company that produces dreams for the individual's private use, just as films used to be viewed, although they've been superseded by 'dreamies'. Dreamies can be viewed in private at home by anyone with the equipment and cash to buy or rent them (like present day videos or DVDs). They are produced by specially trained individuals, often social loners or eccentrics as a result of their intensive training over many years.

Weill is shown a new development—under-the-counter pornographic dreamies—and asked by the government to assist in cracking down on them. Meanwhile, he interviews a ten-year-old boy as a potential dreamer, a lucrative occupation if he turns out to be suitable and undergoes training.

He is also told by one of his best dreamers that he does not want to work any more, as it is ruining family life; the dreamer also feels he has lost himself. But Weill knows from experience that the dreamer can't stop dreaming once he's become used to that way of life, even if he wants to.

One of Weill's staff tells him that a competing company is opening a chain of 'dream palaces', where everyone can absorb the same dream simultaneously, but he is of the opinion that it will not work. As he says, dreaming is a private thing.
