= Hellfire Club (disambiguation) =

The Hellfire Club was a name for several exclusive clubs for high-society rakes established in Britain and Ireland in the 18th century.

Hellfire Club may also refer to:

== Film ==
- The Hellfire Club (film), a 1961 film starring Peter Cushing

== Literature ==
- The Hellfire Club, a 1959 novel by Daniel P. Mannix
- The Hellfire Club, a 1995 novel by Peter Straub
- The Hellfire Club (novel), a 2018 novel by Jake Tapper
- Hellfire Club (comics), a fictional society in the Marvel Comics universe

== Music ==
- Hellfire Club (album), an album by Edguy

== Places ==
- Hellfire Club, Dublin, a ruined building on Montpelier Hill in the Dublin Mountains, Ireland
- The Hellfire Club, a closed BDSM nightclub in New York City's Meatpacking District

== Television ==
- "Chapter One: The Hellfire Club", Stranger Things season 4, episode 1 (2022)
- "The Hellfire Club", Killer Contact episode 4 (2013)

== See also ==
- Hellfyre Club, an American alternative hip hop record label
