= What If— =

1952 short story

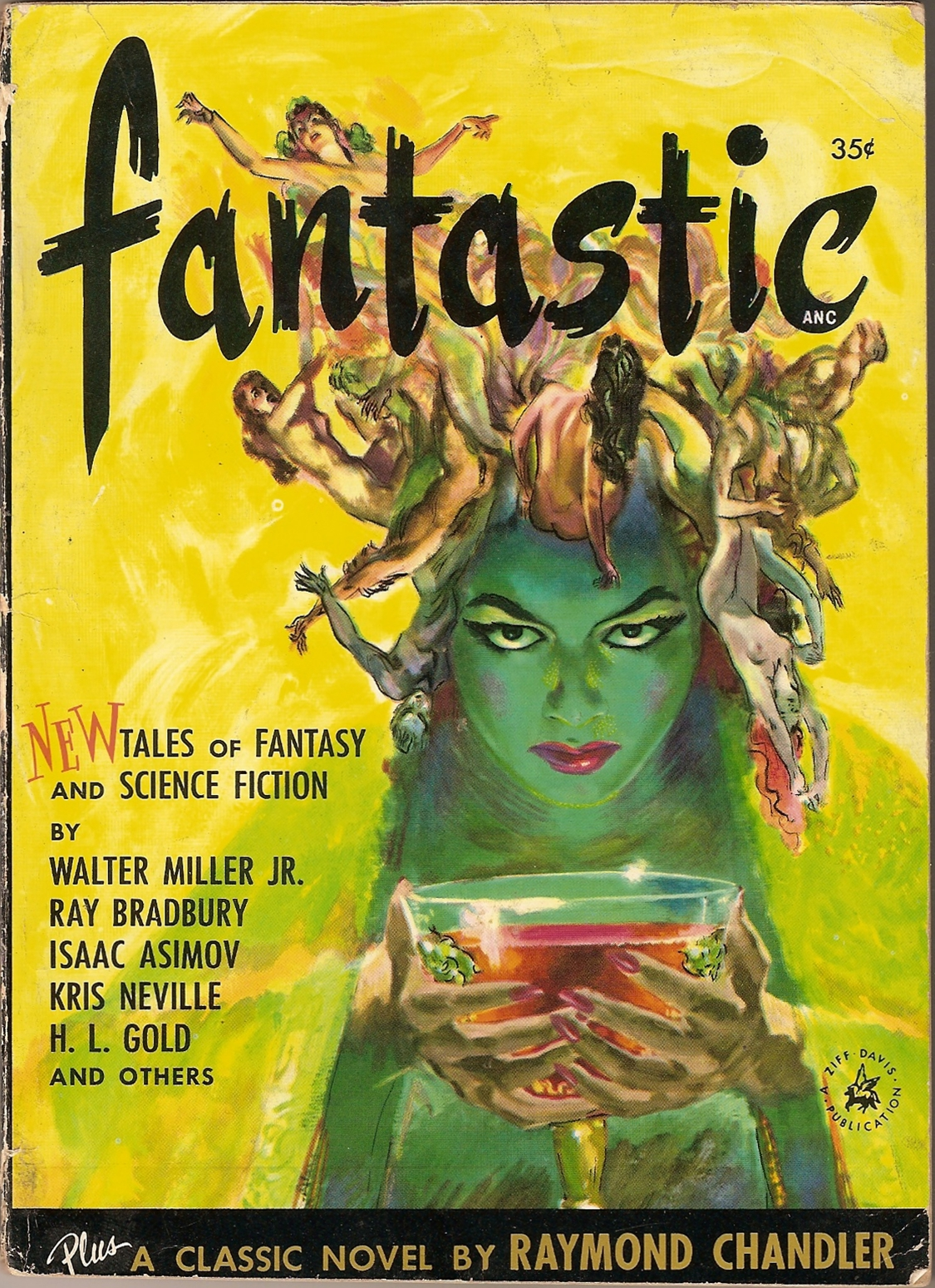
"What If—" was published in the debut issue of Fantastic in 1952

"What If—" is a fantasy short story by American writer Isaac Asimov, first published in the Summer 1952 issue of Fantastic and reprinted in the 1969 collection Nightfall and Other Stories. The story was inspired by the author's wife who, during a car journey they were taking from New York to Boston, asked him where he got his story ideas. Before they arrived, Isaac had thought of a plot based on the journey.

== Plot summary ==
A married couple is traveling on a train from Boston to New York City. They meet a mysterious silent man known only as Mister If, who shows them a small portable television-like device about 6 by 9 inches (15 cm × 23 cm) in size. (Mr. If's first name is implied to be What, but whether this is true is left to the reader.)

On the device's screen, Mr. If shows the couple scenes from their earlier lives and what might have happened if certain minor but pivotal events had not occurred.

Eventually they learned that even if the pivotal event had not taken place, the result would eventually have been the same.

== Background ==
The theme of major events being altered by relatively minor changes would recur in Asimov's 1955 novel The End of Eternity and his 1958 short story "Spell My Name with an S".

== Similar devices in subsequent fiction ==
The story's theme and idea has been used in two episodes of the animated television series Futurama: "Anthology of Interest" and "Anthology of Interest II". Professor Farnsworth demonstrates a 'What If—' machine similar to Mr. If's.

A similar idea has also occurred in "Turn Left", a Series Four episode of the television series Doctor Who.

Neil Gaiman wrote a short story called "The Wedding Present" as introduction for the collection "Smoke and Mirrors". In this story, a couple receives as a wedding present a stack of paper sheets relating what could have happened during their to-come life in common.

The 1998 British-American romantic comedy-drama film Sliding Doors is based on a similar idea. The film alternates between two parallel universes, based on the two paths the central character's life could take depending on whether or not she catches a train, and causing different outcomes in her life.
