= Rain, Rain, Go Away (short story) =

American short story

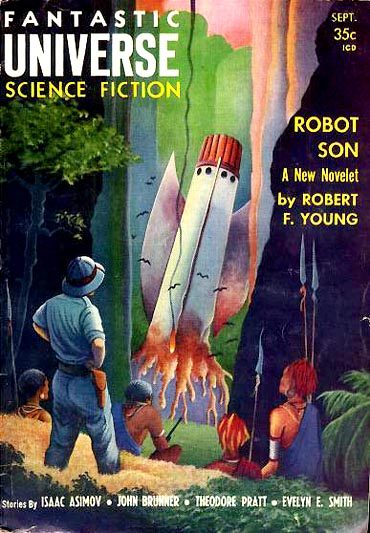
"Rain, Rain, Go Away" was originally published in the September 1959 issue of Fantastic Universe.

"Rain, Rain, Go Away" is a short story by American writer Isaac Asimov. A fantasy/horror story, it was based on an idea by Bob Mills, editor of The Magazine of Fantasy and Science Fiction, but rejected by him. It was instead published in the September 1959 issue of Fantastic Universe and reprinted in the 1975 collection Buy Jupiter and Other Stories.

== Plot summary ==
The story "Rain, Rain, Go Away" concerns a seemingly perfect family, the Sakkaros, who become neighbors of another family, the Wrights. The Wrights are puzzled at the great lengths the Sakkaros go to avoid any contact with water, such as when Mrs. Wright tells her husband that Mrs. Sakkaro's kitchen was so clean, it seemed to be never used, and when she offered Mrs. Wright a glass of water she filled the glass carefully while covered with a napkin, but Mr. Wright chalks it up to Mrs. Sakkaro being a good neighbor. The only other odd fact about the home was that the family always seems to be tanning, but at the slightest chance of rain, they all rush inside the safety of their home. Mr. & Mrs. Wright see the study of the Sakkaro residence is filled with newspapers and encyclopedias, which Mr. Sakkaro explains is part of his research. Nor does the Wright know the ethnicity of their neighbors, with Mrs. Wright thinking it could be a Spanish name while Mr. Wright thinks "Sakkaro" sounds Japanese. (Note: The name "Sakkaro" is an apparent wordplay on saccharo-, a combining form that means "sugar", by Asimov, who displayed a fondness for puns.) To find out more about the Sakkaros the Wrights invite them out, and the Sakkaros pay for them all to go to a town carnival. The Sakkaros are extremely cautious and bring a radio with them that is tuned to the weather channel, and a barometer. At the carnival, they seem to have a good time with Mr. & Mrs. Wright and their son Tommie, but they display bizarre food choices, particularly nothing but cotton candy. Mr. Wright comments to his wife that he offered to buy Mr. Sakkaro a hamburger, who grimly refused, and Mrs. Wright also remarks that she had a similar reaction from Mrs. Sakkaro when she offered a soft drink. When their radio unexpectedly calls for rain, the Sakkaros appear to be in shock until they get to their house. When they pull up, it starts to drizzle, and the Sakkaros rush to get to the safety of their home. Mrs. Wright begins to say, "Honestly, George, you would think they were..." When the rain begins before they reach the Sakkaros' front door and they dissolve in the water. "... made of sugar and afraid they would melt," Mrs. Wright continues in horror.

== Sources ==
- Asimov, Isaac (1975). Buy Jupiter, and Other Stories (1st ed.). Garden City, N.Y.: Doubleday. ISBN 0-385-05077-1.
