= Blank! =

1957 short story by Isaac Asimov

- Short story by Isaac Asimov
- First publication of "Blank!" (cover art by Ed Emshwiller)
- Genre: Science fiction

Publication
- Published in: Infinity Science Fiction
- Publication date: June 1957

"Blank!" is a science fiction short story by American writer Isaac Asimov. It was commissioned by Larry Shaw, editor of Infinity Science Fiction, as being the least inspirational title on which to base a story. Harlan Ellison and Randall Garrett were also invited to submit stories based on the same title; Garrett wrote one with "Blank?" as the title while Ellison submitted "Blank." All three were published in the magazine in June 1957. Asimov's story was later reprinted in the 1975 collection Buy Jupiter and Other Stories.

== Plot summary ==
The story is about a scientist who is experimenting with time travel. He persuades a reluctant colleague to join him on a journey in the machine he has developed. Despite the inventor's protestations that nothing can go wrong, something does go wrong, and the two travelers find themselves stuck in non-time, between two time-particles. As they fade into unconsciousness, they realize that 'where even eternity was meaningless, there would only be – blank!'
