= Founding Father (short story) =

Short story by Isaac Asimov

"Founding Father" was the cover story for the October 1965 issue of Galaxy Science Fiction.

"Founding Father" is a science fiction short story by American writer Isaac Asimov. It was first published in the October 1965 issue of Galaxy Science Fiction, and reprinted in the 1975 collection Buy Jupiter and Other Stories. It was inspired by a cover painting of a space-helmeted face backed by several crosses, provided by the magazine's editor, Frederik Pohl.

The story was nominated for the 1966 Nebula Award for Best Short Story.

== Plot summary ==
An exploratory spacecraft of the Galactic Corps, charged with opening up planets for human colonisation, sometimes by terraforming, crash-lands on an alien planet. They find that the ecology is heavy in ammonia, making the atmosphere unbreathable by humans, and the soil unsuitable for the Earth-type plants they have brought for colonisation.

As they are unable to take off again, the crew spend their time trying to adjust the environment to make it suitable for possible future human colonists, by cultivating Earth plants which will create oxygen. Although they spend many years at this task, they fail and, one by one, they die of ammonia poisoning.

As the last man dies, the flesh of the buried crew feeds the plants and finally helps them to flourish, providing the catalyst that alters the environment to become more Earth-like.
