= 2430 A.D. =

- Short story by Isaac Asimov
- Language: English
- Genre: Science fiction

Publication
- Published in: Think
- Publication date: October 1970

"2430 A.D." is a science fiction short story by the American writer Isaac Asimov. It first appeared in the October 1970 issue of Think, the IBM house magazine, and was reprinted in Asimov's 1975 collection Buy Jupiter and Other Stories.

Early in 1970 the author was commissioned by Think to write a story based on a quotation by writer and social commentator J. B. Priestley from his 1957 book Thoughts in the Wilderness:

Between midnight and dawn, when sleep will not come and all the old wounds begin to ache, I often have a nightmare vision of a future world in which there are billions of people, all numbered and registered, with not a gleam of genius anywhere, not an original mind, a rich personality, on the whole packed globe.

Asimov, assuming that Think wanted a story that illustrated Priestley's quotation, crafted "2430 A.D." He selected the date because he calculated that at the then-current rate of human population growth, doubling every thirty-five years, that would be the year when the world's animal biomass would consist entirely of human beings. Asimov wrote the story on April 26, 1970, but it was rejected as Think had actually wanted a story that refuted the quotation. ("Well, they never said so," Asimov remarked later.) After Asimov wrote a second story that did refute the quotation, Think took the first story after all and published it in their October 1970 issue. The second story was later published in Analog magazine as "The Greatest Asset". Both stories inspired by the Priestley quote were included in the 1975 collection Buy Jupiter and Other Stories.

== Plot summary ==
Earth has established a totally balanced and ecologically stable underground society (similar to that portrayed in Asimov's novel The Caves of Steel). But one man, Cranwitz, regarded as a deviant and eccentric because he keeps a few animals as pets, refuses to get rid of these animals, the last non-human inhabitants of the planet.

He is finally persuaded by his sector representatives to exterminate his pets, but also commits suicide. This leaves Earth in 'perfection', with its fifteen trillion inhabitants, twenty billion tons of human brain and the 'exquisite nothingness of uniformity'.
