= Gimmicks Three =

- Short story by Isaac Asimov
- Country: United States
- Language: English
- Genre: Fantasy

Publication
- Published in: The Magazine of Fantasy and Science Fiction
- Publication type: Periodical
- Publisher: Fantasy House
- Media type: Print (Magazine, Hardback, Paperback)
- Publication date: November 1956

"Gimmicks Three" is a fantasy short story by American writer Isaac Asimov. It was first published in the November 1956 issue of The Magazine of Fantasy and Science Fiction under the title "The Brazen Locked Room", and reprinted under Asimov's original title in the 1957 collection Earth is Room Enough. The title refers to what Asimov called "the three well-worn gimmicks of pact with the devil, locked room mystery, and time travel".

== Plot summary ==
Isidore Wellby has just left the army and, abandoned by his girlfriend, feels lost and let down. In desperation, he signs away his soul in blood to a demon named Shapur. On the proviso that eventually he will be forced to enter hell, either as an ordinary damned soul or as a member of the cadre, he is allotted a number of demonic powers, the nature of which are not initially explained to him.

Ten years later, he has become a successful businessman and has married his erstwhile girlfriend. Shapur reappears to demand his price. If Wellby can perform a simple task using his demonic powers, Wellby will be accepted as a member of the elite of hell. Otherwise, he will be just an ordinary damned soul.

Wellby is confined to an apparently sealed bronze room and challenged to escape from it. Eventually, with little time left, he realizes that he has the power to move through time - the fourth dimension - and travels backward, thus escaping from the room.

In the story's climax, it is revealed that he has moved back to the time before he had signed away his soul and so he is able to turn down Shapur's persuasive offer, much to the demon's fury. However, he still had his ten successful years, since deals with Hell can give a person nothing he could not have obtained on his own. And since the demon no longer owns his soul, Wellby has many more years left.
