= Exile to Hell =

- Short story by Isaac Asimov
- Country: United States
- Language: English
- Genre: Science fiction

Publication
- Published in: Analog Science Fiction and Fact
- Publication type: Periodical
- Publisher: Conde Nast
- Media type: Print (Magazine, Hardback & Paperback)
- Publication date: May 1968

"Exile to Hell" is a science fiction short story by American writer Isaac Asimov. It appeared in the May 1968 issue of Analog Science Fiction and Fact and was included in the 1975 collection Buy Jupiter and Other Stories.

The serialization of his novelization of Fantastic Voyage in The Saturday Evening Post in 1966 filled Asimov with the ambition to publish an original story there before the magazine ceased publication. He therefore wrote "Exile to Hell" in June 1967. The Post rejected the story, though, just as they would have in their heyday twenty years before (as Asimov noted in In Joy Still Felt). It then occurred to Asimov that he had not submitted a story to Analog since Thiotimoline and the Space Age in 1960. The story was accepted, and appeared in the May 1968 issue. In Asimov's introduction to the story in Buy Jupiter and Other Stories, he notes that when the story first appeared in Analog, the pre-story blurb by editor John W. Campbell spoiled the story by telegraphing the ending.

== Plot summary ==
A man named Jenkins is put on trial after accidentally damaging a computer system that potentially could have a disastrous effect on the totally computerized underground society in which he lives. The trial, which is carried out by computers programmed with prosecution and defence arguments, finds Jenkins guilty of equipment damage, a major crime by the society's laws. He is sentenced to permanent exile, a punishment considered harsher than execution.

Only at the end of the story is it revealed that the society is built beneath the surface of the Moon, with a totally conditioned and computer-controlled environment, and that the place of exile is on the surface of the Earth.
