= Flies (Asimov short story) =

Short story by Isaac Asimov

"Flies" is a science fiction short story by Isaac Asimov. It was first published in the June 1953 issue of Magazine of Fantasy and Science Fiction, and later appeared in Asimov's collections Nightfall and Other Stories (1969).

The author's original title for the story was "King Lear, IV, i, 36–37", (Note: The reference is to the lines "As flies to wanton boys are we to the gods,— they kill us for their sport.") but Anthony Boucher, editor at the time, suggested a different title, which became "Flies".

== Plot summary ==
A group of former college students meet at a reunion twenty years after graduation and discuss their achievements. One of the ex-students, now an animal behaviorist, is tormented by his ability to read the thoughts of his former friends in their small behavioral tics and gestures. He reflects on his life and research, as well as the pain it has brought him, while one of his friends, a chemist and insecticide researcher, fights off the flies that continually crowd around him. Unbeknownst to all but the behaviorist, the flies' behavior is caused by their belief that he is Beelzebub.
