= In a Good Cause— =

1951 short story by Isaac Asimov

"In a Good Cause—" is a science fiction short story by American writer Isaac Asimov. The story first appeared in a 1951 edition of the anthology New Tales of Space and Time and was reprinted in the collection Nightfall and Other Stories (1969).

The book begins with the description of a statue containing three dates and an epigram: "In a good cause, there are no failures. There are only delayed successes." This is followed by a section for each of the three dates.

== Plot summary ==
The story opens with a description of a statue on the grounds of the United Worlds organization raised to Richard "Dick" Altmayer. It displays a quote and three dates, which correspond to the three days upon which he was arrested for crimes motivated by his beliefs. The first is in the year 2755 of the "Atomic Era" (corresponding to 4700 AD in Asimovean chronology). In each case the public is initially outraged by his action but ultimately considers him a hero.

Altmayer and his friend Geoffrey Stock have opposing positions when conscripted into military service for a war between human-occupied star systems. Stock willingly reports for military duty, whilst Altmayer protests, believing that the various interstellar nations of humanity should be united against the Diaboli, an intelligent non-human race that also occupies several planetary systems in the galaxy.

Over a 45-year period, Stock reaches high military rank and then political office, whilst Altmayer is imprisoned and kept under house arrest several times for his radical idealism. He starts political parties and protest movements, all of which fail to achieve their objectives of uniting humanity.

Ultimately, Altmayer's desire for a united humanity is achieved after a war against the Diaboli. This unity, however, has been realised only through Stock's political manipulations rather than Altmayer's idealistic actions. Stock asks his one-time friend to be one of the delegates from Earth to a peace conference, but realizes that history will not record his own participation in the unification of humanity, but will instead vilify him as a cruel and short-sighted politician.

== Notes ==
Asimov said that although stories usually depict their authors' opinions, "this particular story ... doesn't quite reflect my own feelings. Groff Conklin ... once said that he liked this story, even though he disagreed with its philosophy, and to my embarrassment, I find that that is exactly how I myself feel".
