= Waterclap =

- Short story by Isaac Asimov
- Country: United States
- Language: English
- Genre: Science fiction

Publication
- Published in: If
- Publication type: Periodical
- Publisher: Universal Publishing
- Media type: Print (Magazine)
- Publication date: April 1970

"Waterclap" is a science fiction short story by American writer Isaac Asimov. The story was written at the request of a movie company and was intended to serve as the basis of a film treatment. The author did not want to do the story, and only met with the studio representative as a favor to his publisher, which had already accepted an advance payment for it. When the representative outlined the plot and characters, Asimov knew he could not write such a story, but did not want to refuse at a dinner the film studio was paying for. The draft he wrote did not follow the requested approach. The story was rejected by the studio, and the advance returned at Asimov's request. A later draft was published in the April 1970 issue of If (May 1970 in the UK edition) and was reprinted in the 1976 collection The Bicentennial Man and Other Stories.

== Plot summary ==
Steven Demerest, a safety engineer at Luna City, a colony on the Moon, visits Earth and takes a trip by bathyscape to Ocean-Deep, an experimental colony at the base of the Puerto Rico Trench, where he meets its chief, John Bergen, and his wife Annette.

Ostensibly on a visit to exchange views on safety issues, Demerest is in fact planning to destroy Ocean-Deep. He reasons that if the project is found to be unsafe and thereby abandoned, more funding will be directed by the Planetary Project Commission (PPC) to the lunar colonies and space exploration.

When he finds that Annette is pregnant, he has his first pang of guilt. Nevertheless, he proceeds with his objective and overrides the safety systems that control the airlocks, whilst holding the Bergens hostage with a low-power laser.

The Bergens try to talk him out of his object, and feed him a not-entirely-untrue story that Ocean-Deep is in fact an experimental precursor to colonizing Jupiter and other planets. Demerest, realizing that his planned destruction will have the opposite effect to what he intends, surrenders.
