= The Immortal Bard =

1954 science fiction short story by Isaac Asimov

- Short story by Isaac Asimov
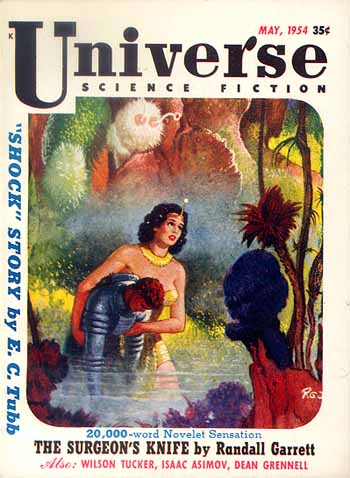
- Country: United States
- Language: English
- Genre: Science fiction

Publication
- Published in: Universe Science Fiction
- Publication type: Periodical
- Publisher: Palmer Publications
- Media type: Print (Magazine, Hardback & Paperback)
- Publication date: May 1954

"The Immortal Bard" is a science fiction short story by American writer Isaac Asimov. It was first published in the May 1954 issue of Universe Science Fiction, and has since been republished in several collections and anthologies, including Earth Is Room Enough (1957) and The Best Science Fiction of Isaac Asimov (1986). (In Earth Is Room Enough (Panther Books Ltd. reprint 1973 edition) the title of the story is "An Immortal Bard" in the Contents list but "The Immortal Bard" on the destination page. There is a similar, but reversed variation in title with "The Author's Ordeal.") Like many of his stories, it is told as a conversation, in this case between two professors at a college faculty's annual Christmas party.

It is likely that Asimov wrote this short story after seeing how literary academia viewed his own writing. His autobiography, In Memory Yet Green, describes how science fiction gradually became more "respectable", while at the same time, professors of literary studies wrote things about SF — even about Asimov's own stories — which he completely failed to grasp. "The Immortal Bard" is an expression of Asimov's own deep admiration for William Shakespeare which also satirizes the interpretations built upon Shakespeare's work — such as symbolic, Freudian, and New Critical.

== Plot summary ==
The physics professor, Dr. Phineas Welch, has gotten himself slightly drunk and begins speaking with Scott Robertson, a young English teacher. Welch announces, "I can bring back the spirits of the illustrious dead." He goes on to explain that, via "temporal transference", he can bring people from the past into the present. At first, Robertson treats Welch's story as an amusing, alcohol-induced fantasy, and he begins to enjoy the conversation. Welch says that he first tried bringing eminent scientists from earlier eras—Archimedes, Isaac Newton, Galileo Galilei. However, none of the scientists were adaptable enough to handle twentieth-century society; Welch realized that he needed to find an adaptable, universal mind.

"So," he continues, "I tried Shakespeare." This startles and incenses Robertson, since it strikes "closer to home". Shakespeare, according to Welch, was flexible enough to understand human beings of every era, and he adjusted to the modern world much more easily. Welch reports that Shakespeare was eager to find what future generations thought of him. When Welch finds him a book of literary criticism, Shakespeare cries in exasperation, "God ha' mercy! What cannot be racked from words in five centuries? One could wring, methinks, a flood from a damp clout!"

Eventually, Welch says, he enrolled Shakespeare in a night school class on Shakespeare's plays—taught, as it happens, by Robertson. At this point, Robertson begins to become genuinely worried. He recalls a bald man with an unusual accent, and starts to doubt whether Welch's story was all alcoholic fantasy. Timidly, he asks Welch what happened, and the physicist explodes with anger. Shakespeare had been humiliated, he says, and Welch had to send him back to 1600: "You poor simpleton, you flunked him!"

Asimov comments that he wrote the story to get back at English teachers. Additionally he says, that the story is really about himself. Not being able to answer most of the questions he's posed on his works, he realizes he would probably flunk a test on himself.

== See also ==
- Pierre Menard, Author of the Quixote
