= Hell Fire (2012 film) =

2012 independent horror film

- Film poster
- Directed by: Marc Fratto
- Written by: Marc Fratto
- Produced by: Marc Fratto; Frank Garfi
- Starring: J. Scott Green; Katelyn Marie Marshall; Selene Beretta
- Cinematography: Marc Fratto
- Music by: Marc Fratto; Frank Garf
- Production company: Insane-O-Rama Productions
- Distributed by: Maxim Media International
- Release date: September 2012 (Horrorfind)
- Running time: 93 minutes
- Country: United States
- Language: English

Hell Fire is a 2015 independent horror film that was written, directed, and co-produced by Marc Fratto.

== Synopsis ==
When a group of prostitutes decide to rob their pimp's house, they are unaware that their actions will put them face to face with the Antichrist.

== Cast ==
- J. Scott Green as The Antichrist
- Katelyn Marie Marshall as Justine D'Neapolis / Fyre
- Selene Beretta as Rosetta
- Jennice Carter as Shanice Holden / Destinee
- Kasey Williams as Phoebe Foster / Cinnamon
- Ray Chao as Tony 'Tiny' Wang
- Jodi Mara as Anna Wang
- Shashone Lambert as Marisol
- Joshua Nelson as Baby Daddy
- Chris Davis as Gabriel 'Dark Gable' James
- Mindy Wedner as Kasey D'Neapolis / Butterfly
- Xavier Rodney as Shawn
- Gaetano Iacono as Nick
- Tyrone Miller as Shawn's Bodyguard
- James E. Smith as Dr. Bill

== Reception ==
Critical reception was mixed during the film's limited release Fangoria and Ain't It Cool News both praised Hell Fire, and Fangoria wrote "Out of its mind and bloody as heck, it’s a jolt of adrenaline into the veins of the grassroots horror scene." HorrorNews.net in their rev that while the acting "wasn't great" that the plot was "solid" and that the actors did "show passion of their roles". Yell Magazine's Shawn Loeffler called it a "generally an all-around B movie," with strong effects and realistic dialogue.
