= Hellfire Corner =

Coordinates: 50.8490°N 2.9164°E

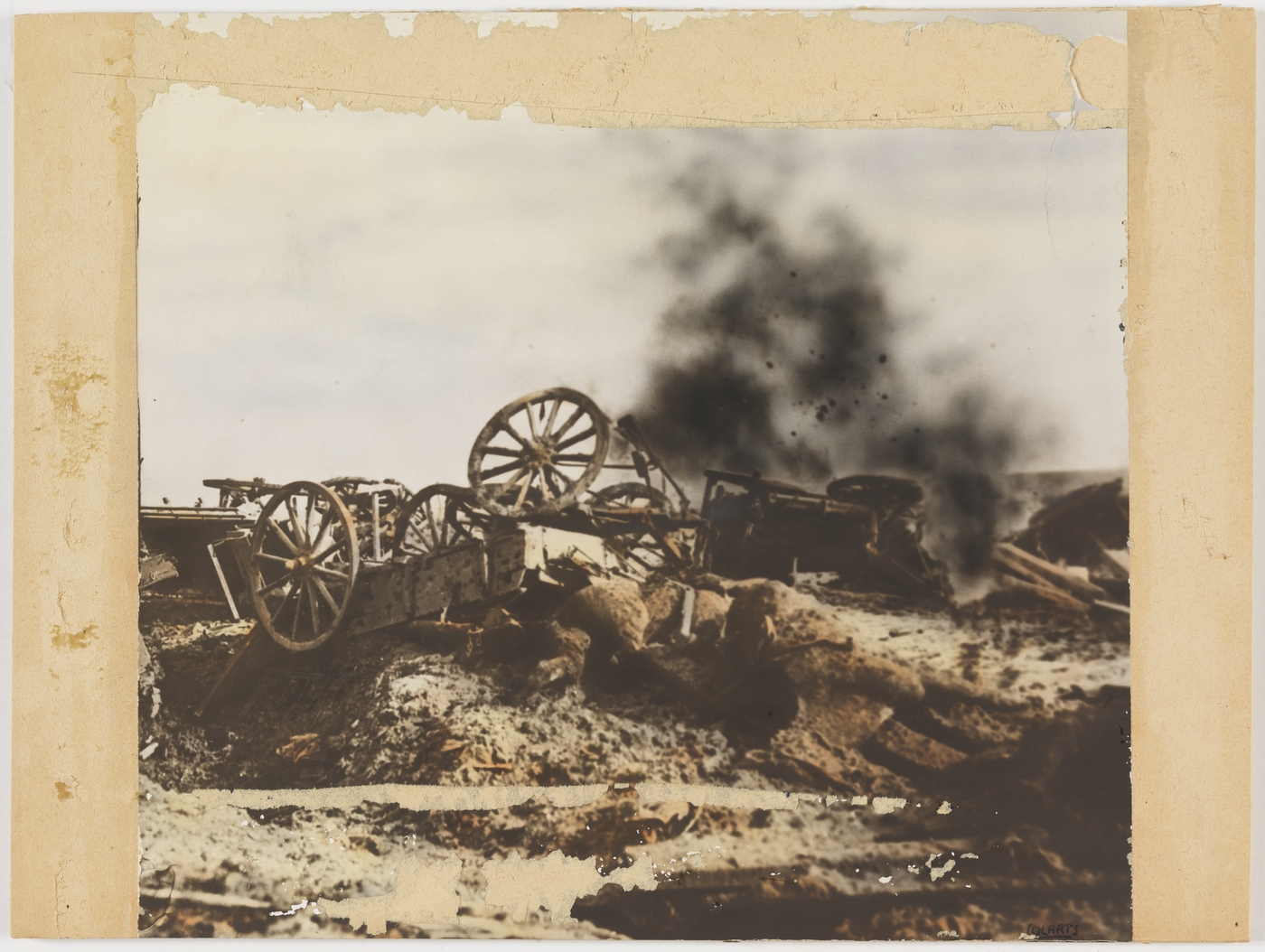
Hellfire Corner on the Menin Road, Third Battle of Ypres (1917)

Hellfire Corner was a junction in the Ypres Salient in the First World War. The road was the main supply route for the British Second Army in this sector that passed along the road from Ypres to Menin, the Menin Road. A section of the road was where the Sint-Jan-Zillebeke road and the Ypres–Roulers (Roeselare) railway (line 64) crossed the road. German positions overlooked this spot and their guns were registered upon it so that movement through this junction was perilous, making it the most dangerous place in the sector.

== Bibliography ==
- Simkins, Peter (1991). World War I: The Western Front. New York: Random House. ISBN 0-51-705320-9.
