= The Singing Bell =

- Short story by Isaac Asimov
- Country: United States
- Language: English
- Genre: Science fiction mystery

Publication
- Published in: Fantasy and Science Fiction
- Publication type: Periodical
- Publisher: Fantasy House
- Media type: Print (Magazine, Hardback & Paperback)
- Publication date: January 1955

Chronology
- Series: Wendell Urth
| — | The Talking Stone |

"The Singing Bell" is a science fiction mystery short story by American writer Isaac Asimov, which first appeared in the January 1955 issue of The Magazine of Fantasy and Science Fiction and was reprinted in the 1968 collection Asimov's Mysteries. "The Singing Bell" was the first of Asimov's Wendell Urth stories.

== Plot summary ==
Louis Peyton is a master criminal who spent decades challenging the law, with the police having never managed to gather any direct evidence against him. One August, Albert Cornwell takes him to the Moon to retrieve a cache of extremely valuable "Singing Bells". The Bells are lunar rocks which, when struck by the correct stroker, make an incredibly beautiful sound. Not a dozen people on Earth own a flawless Bell, while the cache contains two dozen, and each can be sold for a hundred thousand dollars minimum (assuming 1955 prices, over a million each in 2023). Cornwell had obtained the map to the cache by killing their discoverer. Once the retrieval is complete, Peyton kills Cornwell, flies back to Earth and hides the Bells. The ship is programmed to lift off automatically and then explodes.

The policeman in charge of the investigation, Inspector Davenport, contacts Wendell Urth to help him prove that Peyton had been on the Moon. Davenport has been trying to pin Peyton down for years, but the man never leaves direct evidence. He has no alibi in the regular sense, but he doesn't need one, either. Every police record shows that Peyton spends each August totally isolated on his Colorado ranch behind a powerful force-field, even having jumped bail once for the purpose. His routine has been no different this year until he entered the estate, and that's where he has been arrested. As such, any court will have to assume Peyton spent his August as usual. However, as far as Davenport is concerned, only Peyton has both the impudence and the contacts for trying to sell smuggled Singing Bells. What he needs is to psycho-probe Peyton to get sufficient evidence for a conviction. However, since a person can only be psycho-probed once-in-a-lifetime, Davenport needs enough evidence to prove the guilt to begin with, if not to the court, then at least to his superiors.

Urth gives Peyton his own flawed, yet still valuable Singing Bell to examine. He then has Peyton throw it back to him. The toss falls short and the Bell is destroyed when it crashes to the floor. Urth has demonstrated that Peyton had been off-planet very recently, despite his claim to the contrary, and had not yet readjusted to Earth's gravity. The killer is taken away to be psycho-probed. Urth requests a perfect bell as his fee and compensation.
