= Birth of a Notion (short story) =

- Short story by Isaac Asimov
- Country: United States
- Language: English
- Genre: Science fiction

Publication
- Published in: Amazing Stories
- Publication type: Periodical
- Publisher: Ziff-Davis
- Media type: Print (Magazine, Hardback & Paperback)
- Publication date: June 1976

"Birth of a Notion" is a science fiction short story by American writer Isaac Asimov. The story was written to celebrate the semicentennial (fiftieth anniversary) of the magazine Amazing Stories in June 1976. It appeared in the 1976 collection The Bicentennial Man and Other Stories.

== Plot summary ==
Simeon Weill, a physicist, experiments with time travel and travels back to New York City in 1925, where he meets Hugo Gernsback, a science fiction author and Weill's hero.

Although only given a few minutes sitting with Gernsback on a park bench, he manages to convey to the author some of the scientific developments to come in the next fifty years. Just before being transported back to 1976, he suggests that Gernsback's proposed science fiction magazine be titled Amazing Stories.
