= It's Such a Beautiful Day (short story) =

- Short story by Isaac Asimov
- Country: United States
- Language: English
- Genre: Science fiction

Publication
- Published in: Star Science Fiction Stories No.3
- Publisher: Ballantine Books
- Media type: Print (Paperback)
- Publication date: 1955

"It's Such A Beautiful Day" is a science fiction short story by American writer Isaac Asimov. It was first published in 1955 in Star Science Fiction Stories No.3, an anthology of original stories edited by Frederik Pohl, and later reprinted in the 1969 collection Nightfall and Other Stories.

== Plot summary ==
Set in the year 2117, the story presents District A-3, a newly built suburb of San Francisco, and the world's first community to be built entirely using Doors, a method of travel via teleportation.

When the Door that transfers him from home to school fails, Richard "Dickie" Hanshaw takes a dislike to the method and starts to wander outside in the unfamiliar open, exposed to the elements. When he catches a cold, Mrs. Hanshaw is horrified and takes him to see Dr. Sloane, a psychiatrist, afraid that her son's wanderings are signs of a mental abnormality.

Despite his own misgivings, Dr. Sloane invites Dickie to go for a walk with him in the open, and Sloane learns to understand and appreciate the boy's dislike of moving around by matter transference and his newly acquired interest in the open air. Dr. Sloane advises Mrs. Hanshaw not to disapprove of Dickie's odd hobby so heavily, to treat it as if it is no big deal. This will remove its tantalizing aura of forbiddenness, and soon Dickie will lose interest in it and turn his attention to more "normal" interests.

At the conclusion of his consultation with Dickie and Mrs. Hanshaw, Dr. Sloane succumbs to Dickie's viewpoint and says, "You know, it's such a beautiful day that I think I'll walk."
