= Darwinian Pool Room =

1950 short story by Isaac Asimov

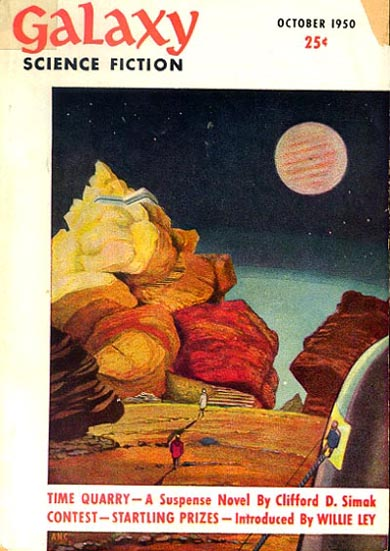
"Darwinian Pool Room" was published in the debut issue of Galaxy Science Fiction in 1950

"Darwinian Pool Room" is a science fiction short story by American writer Isaac Asimov. It was first published in the October 1950 issue of Galaxy Science Fiction, edited by Horace L Gold, and reprinted in the 1975 collection Buy Jupiter and Other Stories. The story was inspired by lunch-time discussions between the author and his colleagues at Boston University. In 1989 Asimov noted, "I have always considered it among the least satisfactory stories I have ever written".

== Plot summary ==
A group of scientists held a lunch-time discussion concerning the evolution and extinction of lifeforms on Earth, including the dinosaurs. One of them concludes that the present civilization may be coming to an end, that no one can tell what or who comes next, and if it is a part of the divine purpose. Furthermore, he strongly hints that in creating both robots and nuclear weapons, humanity has created its own doom and successors.
