= Silly Asses =

1958 short story by Isaac Asimov

"Silly Asses" is a science fiction short story by American writer Isaac Asimov. It was published in the February 1958 issue of Future Science Fiction, after having been twice rejected by other outlets. It was subsequently included in the collections Have You Seen These? in 1974 and Buy Jupiter and Other Stories in 1975. It runs to less than two pages in paperback.

== Plot summary ==
The people of Earth have developed atomic power. As such, they are recorded by Naron the Rigellian, the long-lived keeper of the Galactic records, as having achieved maturity. But when the keeper learns that they have not yet penetrated space and that they test their atomic weapons on their own planetary surface, he strikes them from the record, commenting that Earth people are 'Silly Asses'.
