= Isaac Asimov bibliography (alphabetical) =

Bibliography of the books written or edited by Isaac Asimov

This is a bibliography of the books written or edited by Isaac Asimov, arranged alphabetically. Asimov was a prolific author, and he engaged in many collaborations with other authors. This list may not yet be complete. The total number of books listed here is over 500. Asimov died in 1992 at age 72; a small number of his books were published posthumously.

== A ==
- ABC's of Ecology
- ABC's of Space
- ABC's of the Earth
- ABC's of the Ocean
- Adding a Dimension
- All the Troubles of the World
- Alpha Centauri, the Nearest Star
- The Alternate Asimovs
- Amazing Stories: Sixty Years of the Best Science Fiction
- Ancient Astronomy
- Animals of the Bible
- The Annotated 'Gulliver's Travels'
- The Asimov Chronicles
- Asimov Laughs Again
- Asimov on Astronomy
- Asimov on Chemistry
- Asimov on Numbers
- Asimov on Physics
- Asimov on Science
- Asimov on Science Fiction
- Asimov's Annotated 'Don Juan'
- Asimov's Annotated Gilbert and Sullivan
- Asimov's Annotated 'Paradise Lost'
- Asimov's Biographical Encyclopedia of Science and Technology
- Asimov's Biographical Encyclopedia of Science and Technology, 2D Ed.
- Asimov's Biographical Encyclopedia of Science and Technology, 3D Ed.
- Asimov's Chronology of Science and Discovery
- Asimov's Chronology of the World
- Asimov's Galaxy: Reflections on Science Fiction
- Asimov's Guide to Halley's Comet
- Asimov's Guide to Science
- Asimov's Guide to Shakespeare, Volume One
- Asimov's Guide to Shakespeare, Volume Two
- Asimov's Guide to the Bible, Volume One
- Asimov's Guide to the Bible, Volume Two
- Asimov's Mysteries
- Asimov's New Guide to Science
- Asimov's Sherlockian Limericks
- The Asteroids
- Astronomy Today
- Atlantis
- Atom: Journey Across the Subatomic Cosmos
- Authorised Murder (Originally published as Murder at the ABA)
- Azazel (1988)

== B ==
- Baker's Dozen: Thirteen Short Fantasy Novels
- Baker's Dozen: Thirteen Short Science Fiction Novels
- Banquets of the Black Widowers
- Before the Golden Age
- The Beginning and the End
- Beginnings: The Story of Origins, of Mankind, Life, the Earth, the Universe
- The Best Mysteries of Isaac Asimov
- The Best New Thing
- The Best of Isaac Asimov
- The Best Science Fiction of Isaac Asimov
- The Bicentennial Man and Other Stories
- The Big Apple Mysteries
- Biochemistry and Human Metabolism
- The Birth and Death of Stars
- The Birth of the United States, 1763–1816
- Breakthroughs in Science
- Building Blocks of the Universe
- Buy Jupiter and Other Stories

== C ==
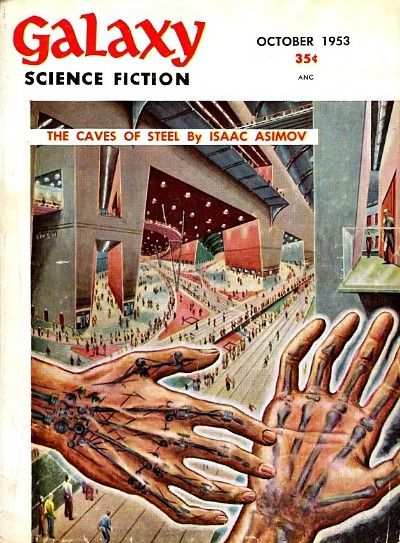
The first installment of Asimov's The Caves of Steel took the cover of the October 1953 issue of Galaxy Science Fiction, illustrated by Ed Emshwiller

- Cal See also Robot series (Asimov)
- Casebook of the Black Widowers
- Catastrophes!
- Caught in the Organ Draft
- The Caves of Steel (1954), See also Robot series (Asimov)
- Change!
- The Chemicals of Life
- Chemistry and Human Health
- Child of Time (with Robert Silverberg, UK title of The Ugly Little Boy)
- A Choice of Catastrophes
- Christopher Columbus: Navigator to the New World
- The Clock We Live on
- The Collapsing Universe
- Colonizing the Planets and Stars
- Comets
- Comets and Meteors
- The Complete Robot (1982), See also Robot series (Asimov)
- The Complete Science Fair Handbook
- The Complete Stories Vol. 1
- The Complete Stories Vol. 2
- Computer Crimes and Capers
- Constantinople, the Forgotten Empire
- Cosmic Critiques: How and Why Ten Science Fiction Stories Work
- Cosmic Knights
- Counting the Eons
- Creations
- The Currents of Space
- Curses

== D ==
- The Dangers of Intelligence and Other Essays
- The Dark Ages
- David Starr, Space Ranger (as Paul French)
- The Death Dealers (later republished as A Whiff of Death)
- Devils
- Did Comets Kill the Dinosaurs?
- The Disappearing Man and Other Mysteries
- The Double Planet
- Dragon Tales
- The Dream, Benjamin's Dream & Benjamin's Bicentennial Blast

== E ==
- The Early Asimov
- Earth Is Room Enough
- Earth: Our Crowded Spaceship
- Earth: Our Home Base
- The Earth's Moon
- An Easy Introduction to the Slide Rule
- The Edge of Tomorrow
- The Egyptians
- Election Day 2084: Science Fiction Stories on the Politics of the Future (edited by Isaac Asimov and Martin H. Greenberg)
- Electricity and Man
- Encounters
- The End of Eternity
- The Ends of the Earth
- Environments Out There
- The Evitable Conflict
- The Exploding Suns
- Exploring the Earth and the Cosmos
- Extraterrestrial Civilizations
- Eyes on the Universe

== F ==
- Fact and Fancy
- Faeries
- Familiar Poems, Annotated
- Fantastic Creatures
- Fantastic Reading: Stories and Activities for Grades 5–8
- Fantastic Voyage
- Fantastic Voyage II: Destination Brain
- Far as Human Eye Could See
- Ferdinand Magellan: Opening the Door to World Exploration
- Fifty Short Science Fiction Tales
- Flying Saucers
- Forward the Foundation
- Foundation
- Foundation and Earth
- Foundation and Empire
- Foundation's Edge
- Franchise
- From Earth to Heaven
- Frontiers II: More Recent Discoveries about Life, Earth, Space, and the Universe
- Frontiers: New Discoveries about Man and His Planet, Outer Space and the Universe (essays originally published in The Los Angeles Times)
- The Future I (with Martin H. Greenberg and Charles G. Waugh)
- The Future in Question
- The Future in Space
- Futuredays: A Nineteenth Century Vision of the Year 2000 (1986) (based on En L'An 2000)

== G ==
- Galaxies
- The Genetic Code
- The Genetic Effects of Radiation
- Ghosts
- Giants
- Ginn Science Program (Advanced A, Advanced B, Intermediate A, Intermediate B, Intermediate C)
- The Gods Themselves
- Gold
- The Golden Door: The United States from 1865 to 1918
- Good Taste
- Great Ideas of Science
- Great Science Fiction Stories by the World's Great Scientists
- The Greeks: A Great Adventure
- A Grossery of Limericks (with John Ciardi)

== H ==
- Hallucination Orbit
- Have You Seen These?
- The Heavenly Host
- Henry Hudson: Arctic Explorer and North American Adventurer
- The History of Biology (chart)
- The History of Chemistry (chart)
- The History of Mathematics (chart)
- The History of Physics
- Hound Dunnit
- How Did We Find Out about (Our) Genes?
- How Did We Find Out about Antarctica?
- How Did We Find Out about Atoms?
- How Did We Find Out about Black Holes?
- How Did We Find Out about Blood?
- How Did We Find Out about Coal?
- How Did We Find Out about Comets?
- How Did We Find Out about Computers?
- How Did We Find Out about Dinosaurs?
- How Did We Find Out about DNA?
- How Did We Find Out about Earthquakes?
- How Did We Find Out about Electricity?
- How Did We Find Out about Energy?
- How Did We Find Out about Germs?
- How Did We Find Out about Lasers?
- How Did We Find Out about Life in the Deep Sea?
- How Did We Find Out about Microwaves?
- How Did We Find Out about Neptune?
- How Did We Find Out about Nuclear Power?
- How Did We Find Out about Numbers?
- How Did We Find Out about Oil?
- How Did We Find Out about Our Human Roots?
- How Did We Find Out about Outer Space?
- How Did We Find Out about Photosynthesis?
- How Did We Find Out about Pluto?
- How Did We Find Out about Robots?
- How Did We Find Out about Solar Power?
- How Did We Find Out about Sunshine?
- How Did We Find Out about Superconductivity?
- How Did We Find Out about the Atmosphere?
- How Did We Find Out about the Beginnings of Life?
- How Did We Find Out about the Brain?
- How Did We Find Out about the Speed of Light?
- How Did We Find Out about the Universe?
- How Did We Find Out about Vitamins
- How Did We Find Out about Volcanoes?
- How Did We Find Out the Earth Is Round?
- How to Enjoy Writing: A Book of Aid and Comfort
- How Was the Universe Born?
- The Hugo Winners
- The Hugo Winners Volume Two
- The Hugo Winners Volume Three
- The Hugo Winners Volume Four
- The Hugo Winners Volume Five
- The Human Body
- The Human Brain

== I ==
- I, Robot: The Illustrated Screenplay (with Harlan Ellison)
- I, Robot (1950), See also Robot series (Asimov)
- I. Asimov: A Memoir
- In Joy Still Felt
- In Memory Yet Green
- In the Beginning
- Inside the Atom
- Inside the Atom (3rd revised edition)
- The Intelligent Man's Guide to Science
- Intergalactic Empires
- Invasions
- Is Anyone There?
- Is Our Planet Warming Up?
- Is There Life on Other Planets?
- Isaac Asimov Presents from Harding to Hiroshima
- Isaac Asimov Presents Superquiz
- Isaac Asimov Presents Superquiz 2
- Isaac Asimov Presents Superquiz 3
- Isaac Asimov Presents Superquiz 4
- Isaac Asimov Presents Tales of the Occult
- Isaac Asimov Presents The Best Crime Stories of the 19th Century
- Isaac Asimov Presents The Best Fantasy of the 19th Century
- Isaac Asimov Presents The Best Horror and Supernatural Stories of the 19th Century
- Isaac Asimov Presents The Best Science Fiction Firsts
- Isaac Asimov Presents The Best Science Fiction of the 19th Century
- Isaac Asimov Presents The Golden Years of Science Fiction: 36 Stories and Novellas
- Isaac Asimov Presents The Golden Years of Science Fiction, Second Series
- Isaac Asimov Presents The Golden Years of Science Fiction, Third Series
- Isaac Asimov Presents The Golden Years of Science Fiction, Fourth Series
- Isaac Asimov Presents The Golden Years of Science Fiction, Fifth Series
- Isaac Asimov Presents The Golden Years of Science Fiction, Sixth Series
- Isaac Asimov Presents The Great SF Stories 1 (1939)
- Isaac Asimov Presents The Great SF Stories 2 (1940)
- Isaac Asimov Presents The Great SF Stories 3 (1941)
- Isaac Asimov Presents The Great SF Stories 4 (1942)
- Isaac Asimov Presents The Great SF Stories 5 (1943)
- Isaac Asimov Presents The Great SF Stories 6 (1944)
- Isaac Asimov Presents The Great SF Stories 7 (1945)
- Isaac Asimov Presents The Great SF Stories 8 (1946)
- Isaac Asimov Presents The Great SF Stories 9 (1947)
- Isaac Asimov Presents The Great SF Stories 10 (1948)
- Isaac Asimov Presents The Great SF Stories 11 (1949)
- Isaac Asimov Presents The Great SF Stories 12 (1950)
- Isaac Asimov Presents The Great SF Stories 13 (1951)
- Isaac Asimov Presents The Great SF Stories 14 (1952)
- Isaac Asimov Presents The Great SF Stories 15 (1953)
- Isaac Asimov Presents The Great SF Stories 16 (1954)
- Isaac Asimov Presents The Great SF Stories 17 (1955)
- Isaac Asimov Presents The Great SF Stories 18 (1956)
- Isaac Asimov Presents The Great SF Stories 19 (1957)
- Isaac Asimov Presents The Great SF Stories 20 (1958)
- Isaac Asimov Presents The Great SF Stories 21 (1959)
- Isaac Asimov Presents The Great SF Stories 22 (1960)
- Isaac Asimov Presents The Great SF Stories 23 (1961)
- Isaac Asimov Presents The Great SF Stories 24 (1962)
- Isaac Asimov Presents The Great SF Stories 25 (1963)
- Isaac Asimov's Book of Facts
- Isaac Asimov's Book of Science and Nature Quotations
- Isaac Asimov's Guide to Earth and Space
- Isaac Asimov's Limericks for Children
- Isaac Asimov's Science Fiction and Fantasy Story-A-Month 1989 Calendar
- Isaac Asimov's Science Fiction Treasury
- Isaac Asimov's Treasury of Humor
- It's Such a Beautiful Day

== J ==
- Jupiter, the Largest Planet
- Jupiter, the Spotted Giant

== K ==
- The Key Word and Other Mysteries
- Kinetics of the Reaction Inactivation of Tyrosinase During Its Catalysis of the Aerobic Oxidation of Catechol (Asimov's doctoral dissertation)
- The Kingdom of the Sun (1960, history of astronomy)
- The Kite that Won the Revolution

== L ==
- The Land of Canaan
- The Last Man on Earth
- Laughing Space, with Janet Jeppson
- Lecherous Limericks
- The Left Hand of the Electron
- Library of the Universe (32 astronomy volumes, ages 9–12)
  - Ancient Astronomy
  - The Asteroids
  - Astronomy Today
  - The Birth and Death of Stars
  - Colonizing the Planets and Stars
  - Comets and Meteors
  - Did Comets Kill the Dinosaurs?
  - Earth: Our Home Base
  - The Earth's Moon
  - The Future in Space
  - How Was The Universe Born?
  - Is There Life on Other Planets?
  - Jupiter: The Spotted Giant
  - Mars: Our Mysterious Neighbor
  - Mercury: The Quick Planet
  - Mythology and the Universe
  - Neptune: The Farthest Giant
  - Our Milky Way and Other Galaxies
  - Our Solar System
  - Piloted Space Flights
  - Pluto: A Double Planet?
  - Quasars, Pulsars and Black Holes
  - Rockets, Probes, and Satellites
  - Saturn: The Ringed Beauty
  - Science Fiction, Science Fact
  - Space Garbage
  - The Space Spotter's Guide
  - The Sun
  - Unidentified Flying Objects
  - Uranus: The Sideways Planet
  - Venus: A Shrouded Mystery
  - The World's Space Programs
- Life and Energy
- Life and Time
- Light
- Limericks: Too Gross, with John Ciardi
- Little Treasury of Dinosaurs (5 Vols.)
- Living in the Future
- The Living River (or The Bloodstream: River Of Life)
- Lucky Starr and the Big Sun of Mercury, as Paul French
- Lucky Starr and the Moons of Jupiter, (as Paul French)
- Lucky Starr and the Oceans of Venus, (as Paul French)
- Lucky Starr and the Pirates of the Asteroids, (as Paul French)
- Lucky Starr and the Rings of Saturn, (as Paul French)

== M ==
- Machines That Think
- Magic: The Final Fantasy Collection
- Magical Wishes
- The Mammoth Book of Classic Science Fiction
- The Mammoth Book of Fantastic Science Fiction
- The Mammoth Book of Golden Age Science Fiction
- The Mammoth Book of Modern Science Fiction
- The Mammoth Book of New World Science Fiction
- The Mammoth Book of Vintage Science Fiction
- The March of the Millennia: A Key to Looking at History
- Mars, the Red Planet
- Mars: Our Mysterious Neighbor
- Mars
- The Martian Way and Other Stories
- Measure of the Universe
- Mercury: The Quick Planet
- Microcosmic Tales
- Miniature Mysteries
- Monsters
- The Moon
- More Lecherous Limericks
- More Tales of the Black Widowers
- More Words of Science
- Murder at the ABA
- Murder on the Menu
- Mythical Beasties
- Mythology and the Universe

== N ==
- The Naked Sun (1957), See also Robot series (Asimov)
- The Near East: 10,000 Years of History
- Nebula Award Stories Eight
- Nemesis
- Neptune: The Farthest Giant
- The Neutrino
- The New Hugo Winners, Vol. 2
- The New Hugo Winners
- The New Intelligent Man's Guide to Science
- Nightfall (with Robert Silverberg)
- Nightfall and Other Stories
- Nine Tomorrows
- The Noble Gases, The
- Norby and the Court Jester
- Norby and the Invaders
- Norby and the Lost Princess
- Norby and the Oldest Dragon
- Norby and the Queen's Necklace
- Norby and Yobo's Great Adventure
- Norby Down to Earth
- Norby Finds a Villain
- Norby, the Mixed-Up Robot
- Norby's Other Secret

== O ==
- Of Matters Great and Small
- Of Time and Space and Other Things
- One Hundred Great Fantasy Short-Short Stories
- One Hundred Great Science Fiction Short-Short Stories
- Only a Trillion
- Opus 100
- Opus 200
- Opus 300
- Other Worlds of Isaac Asimov
- Our Angry Earth
- Our Federal Union: The United States from 1816 to 1865
- Our Milky Way and Other Galaxies
- Our Solar System
- Our World in Space
- Out of the Everywhere

== P ==
- Past, Present, and Future
- Pebble in the Sky
- Photosynthesis
- Piloted Space Flights
- The Planet That Wasn't
- Planets for Man (with Stephen H. Dole), Originally Habitable Planets for man.
- Please Explain
- Pluto: A Double Planet?
- The Positronic Man (1992, with Robert Silverberg), See also Robot series (Asimov)
- Prelude to Foundation
- Purr-Fect Crime
- Puzzles of the Black Widowers

== Q ==
- Quasar, Quasar, Burning Bright
- Quasars, Pulsars, and Black Holes
- Quick and Easy Math

== R ==
- Races and People
- Raintree Reading, Series 1
- Raintree Reading, Series 2
- Raintree Reading, Series 3
- Realm of Algebra
- Realm of Measure
- Realm of Numbers
- The Relativity of Wrong
- The Rest of the Robots
- The Return of the Black Widowers
- The Road to Infinity
- Robbie
- Robot Dreams (1986), See also Robot series (Asimov)
- Robot Visions
- Robots
- Robots and Empire (1985), See also Robot series (Asimov)
- Robots from Asimov's
- The Robots of Dawn (1983), See also Robot series (Asimov)
- Robots: Machines in Man's Image
- Rockets, Probes, and Satellites
- The Roman Empire
- The Roman Republic
- The Roving Mind

== S ==
- Sally
- Satellites in Outer Space
- Saturn and Beyond
- Saturn: The Ringed Beauty
- Science Fiction A to Z
- Science Fiction by Asimov
- The Science Fiction Weight-Loss Book
- Science Fiction, Science Fact
- The Science Fictional Olympics (edited by Isaac Asimov, Martin Harry Greenberg and Charles G Waugh)
- The Science Fictional Solar System (edited by Isaac Asimov, Martin Harry Greenberg and Charles G Waugh)
- Science Past—Science Future
- Science, Numbers and I
- The Search for the Elements
- Second Foundation
- The Secret of the Universe
- Senior Sleuths: A Large Print Anthology of Mysteries and Puzzlers
- The Sensuous Dirty Old Man
- Seven Cardinal Virtues of Science Fiction
- The Seven Deadly Sins of Science Fiction
- The Shaping of England
- The Shaping of France
- The Shaping of North America: From Earliest Times to 1763
- Sherlock Holmes through Time and Space
- A Short History of Biology
- A Short History of Chemistry
- Show Business is Murder
- The Solar System and Back
- The Solar System
- Space Garbage
- Space Mail
- Space Mail, Volume II
- Space Shuttles
- The Space Spotter's Guide
- Speculations
- Spells
- The Sport of Crime
- The Stars in Their Courses
- The Stars, Like Dust
- Stars
- Starships
- Still More Lecherous Limericks
- The Story of Ruth 1972
- The Subatomic Monster
- The Sun
- The Sun Shines Bright
- Supermen
- The Science Fictional Solar System

== T ==
- Tales of the Black Widowers
- Tantalizing Locked Room Mysteries
- Think about Space: Where Have We Been and Where Are We Going?
- The Thirteen Crimes of Science Fiction
- Thirteen Horrors of Halloween
- Those Amazing Electronic Thinking Machines
- Three by Asimov
- Through a Glass, Clearly
- Tin Stars
- To the Ends of the Universe
- Today and Tomorrow And--
- Tomorrow's Children
- Towards Tomorrow
- The Tragedy of the Moon
- TV: 2000
- The Twelve Crimes of Christmas
- The Twelve Frights of Christmas
- Twentieth Century Discovery
- The Tyrannosaurus Prescription and One Hundred Other Science Essays

== U ==
- The Ugly Little Boy (with Robert Silverberg)
- Understanding Physics, Volume One: Motion, Sound and Heat
- Understanding Physics, Volume Two: Light, Magnetism and Electricity
- Understanding Physics, Volume Three: The Electron, Proton, and Neutron
- Unidentified Flying Objects
- The Union Club Mysteries
- The Universe From Flat Earth to Quasar
- Uranus: The Sideways Planet

== V ==
- Venus, Near Neighbor of the Sun
- Venus: A Shrouded Mystery
- View from a Height
- Views of the Universe
- Visions of Fantasy: Tales from the Masters
- Visions of the Universe

== W ==
- The Wellsprings of Life
- What Causes Acid Rain?
- What Is a Shooting Star?
- What Is an Eclipse?
- What Makes the Sun Shine?
- What's Happening to the Ozone Layer?
- Where Do We Go from Here?
- Where Does Garbage Go?
- A Whiff of Death (originally published as The Death Dealers)
- Who Done It?
- Why Are Animals Endangered?
- Why Are Some Beaches Oily?
- Why Are the Rain Forests Vanishing?
- Why Are Whales Vanishing?
- Why Do Stars Twinkle?
- Why Do We Have Different Seasons?
- Why Does Litter Cause Problems?
- Why Does the Moon Change Shape?
- Why Is the Air Dirty?
- The Winds of Change and Other Stories
- Witches
- Wizards
- Words from History
- Words from the Exodus
- Words from the Myths
- Words in Genesis
- Words of Science and the History behind Them
- Words on the Map
- The World of Carbon
- The World of Nitrogen
- The World's Space Programs
- Worlds within Worlds

== X ==
- 'X' Stands for Unknown

== Y ==
- Young Extraterrestrials
- Young Ghosts
- Young Monsters
- Young Mutants
- Young Star Travelers
- Young Witches and Warlocks
- Yours, Isaac Asimov

== See also ==
- Isaac Asimov bibliography (categorical)
- Isaac Asimov bibliography (chronological)
- Isaac Asimov short stories bibliography
