= Isaac Asimov bibliography (chronological) =

In a writing career spanning 53 years (1939–1992), science fiction and popular science author Isaac Asimov (1920–1992) wrote and published 40 novels, 383 short stories, over 280 non-fiction books, and edited about 147 others.

In this article, Asimov's books are listed by year (in order of publication within a year, where known) with publisher indicated. They are divided between original works and edited books. Works of fiction are denoted by an asterisk (*) and books for children or adolescents by a dagger (†). Currently, 504 total books are listed here (357 original and 147 edited or annotated by Asimov).

== Original book-length works ==
=== 1950 ===
- Pebble in the Sky* (Doubleday)
- I, Robot* (Gnome Press)

=== 1951 ===
- The Stars, Like Dust * (Doubleday)
- Foundation* (Gnome Press)

=== 1952 ===
- David Starr, Space Ranger*† (Doubleday)
- Foundation and Empire* (Gnome Press)
- The Currents of Space* (Doubleday)
- Biochemistry and Human Metabolism (Williams & Wilkins)

=== 1953 ===
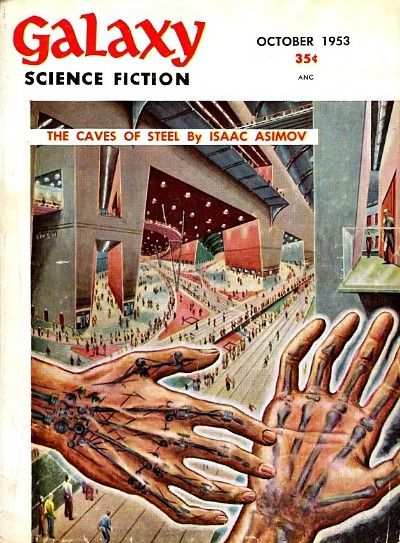
The first installment of Asimov's The Caves of Steel took the cover of the October 1953 issue of Galaxy Science Fiction, illustrated by Ed Emshwiller

- Second Foundation* (Gnome Press)
- Lucky Starr and the Pirates of the Asteroids*† (Doubleday)

=== 1954 ===
- The Caves of Steel* (Doubleday)
- Lucky Starr and the Oceans of Venus*† (Doubleday)
- The Chemicals of Life: Enzymes, Vitamins, and Hormones (Abelard-Schuman)

=== 1955 ===
- The End of Eternity* (Doubleday)
- The Martian Way and Other Stories* (Doubleday)
- Races and People (Abelard-Schuman); co-written with William C. Boyd, illustrations by John Bradford

=== 1956 ===
- Lucky Starr and the Big Sun of Mercury*† (Doubleday)
- Chemistry and Human Health (McGraw-Hill)
- Inside the Atom (Abelard-Schuman)

=== 1957 ===
- The Naked Sun* (Doubleday)
- Lucky Starr and the Moons of Jupiter*† (Doubleday)
- Building Blocks of the Universe (Abelard-Schuman)
- Earth Is Room Enough: Science Fiction: Tales of Our Own Planet* (Doubleday)
- Only a Trillion (Abelard-Schuman)

=== 1958 ===
- The World of Carbon (Abelard-Schuman)
- Lucky Starr and the Rings of Saturn*† (Doubleday)
- The World of Nitrogen (Abelard-Schuman)
- The Death Dealers* (Avon)
  - Republished as A Whiff of Death (1979)

=== 1959 ===
- Nine Tomorrows: Tales of the Near Future* (Doubleday)
- The Clock We Live On (Abelard-Schuman)
- Words of Science, and the History Behind Them† (Houghton Mifflin)
- Realm of Numbers (Houghton Mifflin)
- Breakthroughs in Science (Houghton Mifflin)

=== 1960 ===
- The Living River (Abelard-Schuman)
- The Kingdom of the Sun (Abelard-Schuman)
- Realm of Measure (Houghton Mifflin)
- Satellites in Outer Space (Random House)
- The Wellsprings of Life (Abelard-Schuman)
- The Intelligent Man's Guide to Science (Basic Books)
  - 2nd edition: The New Intelligent Man's Guide to Science (1965; Basic Books)
  - 3rd edition: Asimov's Guide to Science (1972; Basic Books)
  - 4th edition: Asimov's New Guide to Science (1984; Basic Books)
- The Double Planet (Abelard-Schuman)

=== 1961 ===
- Realm of Algebra (Houghton Mifflin)
- Words from the Myths† (Houghton Mifflin)

=== 1962 ===
- Life and Energy (Doubleday)
- Words in Genesis† (Houghton Mifflin; illustrations by William Barss)
- Fact and Fancy (Doubleday)
- Words on the Map† (Houghton Mifflin)
- The Search for the Elements (Basic Books)

=== 1963 ===
- Words from the Exodus† (Houghton Mifflin; illustrations by William Barss)
- The Genetic Code (Orion Press)
- The Human Body: Its Structure and Operation (Houghton Mifflin; illustrations by Anthony Ravielli)
  - Revised/expanded edition, 1992
- View from a Height (Doubleday)
- The Kite That Won the Revolution† (Houghton Mifflin)

=== 1964 ===
- The Human Brain: Its Capacities and Functions (Houghton Mifflin)
- A Short History of Biology (Natural History Press)
- Quick and Easy Math (Houghton Mifflin)
- Adding a Dimension (Doubleday)
- Planets for Man (Random House), with Stephen H. Dole
- The Rest of the Robots* (Doubleday)
- Asimov's Biographical Encyclopedia of Science and Technology (Doubleday)
  - 2nd edition, 1972
  - 3rd edition, 1983

=== 1965 ===
- A Short History of Chemistry (Doubleday)
- The Greeks: A Great Adventure† (Houghton Mifflin)
- Of Time and Space and Other Things (Doubleday)
- An Easy Introduction to the Slide Rule (Houghton Mifflin)

=== 1966 ===
- Fantastic Voyage* (Houghton Mifflin)
- The Noble Gases (Basic Books)
- The Neutrino: Ghost Particle of the Atom (Doubleday)
- The Roman Republic (Houghton Mifflin)
- Understanding Physics, 3 volumes (Walker)
  - Vol. I: Motion, Sound, and Heat
  - Vol. II: Light, Magnetism, and Electricity
  - Vol. III: The Electron, Proton, and Neutron
- The Genetic Effects of Radiation (U.S. AEC)
- The Universe: From Flat Earth to Quasar (Walker)
  - 2nd edition (1971; Walker)
  - 3rd edition (1980), as The Universe: From Flat Earth to Black Holes and Beyond (Walker)
- From Earth to Heaven (Doubleday)

=== 1967 ===
- The Moon (Follet)
- Environments Out There (Scholastic/Abelard-Schuman)
- The Roman Empire (Houghton Mifflin)
- Through a Glass, Clearly* (New English Library)
- Is Anyone There? (Doubleday)
- To the Ends of the Universe (Walker)
- Mars (Follet)
- The Egyptians (Houghton Mifflin)

=== 1968 ===
- Asimov's Mysteries* (Doubleday)
- Science, Numbers, and I (Doubleday)
- Stars (Follet)
- Galaxies (Follet)
- The Near East: 10,000 Years of History (Houghton Mifflin)
- The Dark Ages (Houghton Mifflin)
- Asimov's Guide to the Bible, Volume I (Doubleday)
- Words from History† (Houghton Mifflin)

=== 1969 ===
- Photosynthesis (Basic Books)
- The Shaping of England (Houghton Mifflin)
- Twentieth Century Discovery (Doubleday)
- Nightfall and Other Stories* (Doubleday)
- Asimov's Guide to the Bible, Volume II (Doubleday)
- Opus 100 (Houghton Mifflin)
- ABC's of Space† (Walker)
- Great Ideas of Science (Houghton Mifflin)

=== 1970 ===
- The Solar System and Back (Doubleday)
- Asimov's Guide to Shakespeare, 2 volumes (Doubleday)
- Constantinople: The Forgotten Empire (Houghton Mifflin)
- ABC's of the Ocean† (Walker)
- Light (Follet)

=== 1971 ===
- The Stars in Their Courses (Doubleday)
- What Makes the Sun Shine? (Little, Brown & Co.)
- The Best New Thing*† (World Pub. Co.)
- The Land of Canaan (Houghton Mifflin)
- ABC's of the Earth† (Walker)
- The Sensuous Dirty Old Man (as by Dr. "A.") (Walker)
- Isaac Asimov's Treasury of Humor (Houghton Mifflin)

=== 1972 ===
- The Left Hand of the Electron (Doubleday)
- The Gods Themselves* (Doubleday)
- More Words of Science† (Houghton Mifflin)
- Electricity and Man (U.S. AEC)
- ABC's of Ecology† (Walker)
- The Early Asimov or, Eleven Years of Trying* (Doubleday)
- The Shaping of France (Houghton Mifflin)
- The Story of Ruth† (Doubleday)
- Ginn Science Program, Intermediate Level A† (Ginn)
- Ginn Science Program, Intermediate Level C† (Ginn)
- Worlds Within Worlds (U.S. AEC)
- Ginn Science Program, Intermediate Level B† (Ginn)

=== 1973 ===
- How Did We Find Out the Earth Is Round? † (Walker)
- Comets and Meteors (Follet)
- The Sun (Follet)
- How Did We Find Out About Electricity? † (Walker)
- The Shaping of North America: From Earliest Times to 1763 (Houghton Mifflin)
- Today and Tomorrow and ... (Doubleday)
- Jupiter, the Largest Planet (Lothrop, Lee, & Shepard)
- Ginn Science Program, Advanced Level A† (Ginn)
- Ginn Science Program, Advanced Level B† (Ginn)
- How Did We Find Out About Numbers? † (Walker)
- Please Explain (Houghton Mifflin)
- The Tragedy of the Moon (Abelard-Schuman)
- How Did We Find Out About Dinosaurs? † (Walker)
- The Best of Isaac Asimov* (Sphere)

=== 1974 ===
- Asimov on Astronomy (Doubleday)
- The Birth of the United States: 1763-1816 (Houghton Mifflin)
- Have You Seen These?* (NESRAA)
- Our World in Space (New York Graphic Society)
- How Did We Find Out About Germs? † (Walker)
- Tales of the Black Widowers* (Doubleday)
- Earth: Our Crowded Spaceship (John Day)
- Asimov on Chemistry (Doubleday)
- How Did We Find Out About Vitamins?† (Walker)

=== 1975 ===
- Of Matters Great and Small (Doubleday)
- The Solar System (Follet)
- Our Federal Union: The United States from 1816 to 1865 (Houghton Mifflin)
- How Did We Find Out About Comets?† (Walker)
- Science Past, Science Future (Doubleday)
- Buy Jupiter and Other Stories* (Doubleday)
- Eyes on the Universe: A History of the Telescope (Houghton Mifflin)
- Lecherous Limericks (Walker)
- The Heavenly Host*† (Walker); illustrations by Bernard Colonna
- The Ends of the Earth: The Polar Regions of the World (Weybright & Talley)
- How Did We Find Out About Energy?† (Walker; Series: How Did We Find Out Series)

=== 1976 ===
- ‘The Dream’, ‘Benjamin's Dream’ & ‘Benjamin's Bicentennial Blast’* (Benjamin Franklin Keeps)
- Asimov on Physics (Doubleday)
- Murder at the ABA* (Doubleday)
  - Republished as Authorized Murder (19??)
- How Did We Find Out About Atoms? † (Walker)
- Good Taste* (Apocalypse Press)
- The Planet That Wasn't (Doubleday)
- The Bicentennial Man and Other Stories* (Doubleday)
- More Lecherous Limericks (Walker)
- More Tales of the Black Widowers* (Doubleday/Crime Club)
- Alpha Centauri, the Nearest Star (Lothrop, Lee, & Shepard)
- How Did We Find Out About Nuclear Power?† (Walker)

=== 1977 ===
- The Collapsing Universe: The Story of Black Holes (Walker)
- Asimov on Numbers (Doubleday)
- How Did We Find Out About Outer Space?† (Walker)
- Still More Lecherous Limericks (Walker)
- The Beginning and the End (Doubleday)
- Mars, the Red Planet (Lothrop, Lee, & Shepard)
- The Golden Door: The United States from 1865 to 1918 (Houghton Mifflin)
- The Key Word and Other Mysteries* (Walker)
- Asimov's Sherlockian Limericks (Mysterious)

=== 1978 ===
- Quasar, Quasar, Burning Bright (Doubleday)
- How Did We Find Out About Earthquakes? † (Walker)
- Animals of the Bible† (Doubleday)
- Limericks: Too Gross; or Two Dozen Dirty Stanzas (W. W. Norton)
- How Did We Find Out About Black Holes? † (Walker)
- Life and Time (Doubleday)

=== 1979 ===
- Saturn and Beyond (Lothrop, Lee, & Shepard)
- Opus 200 (Houghton Mifflin)
- In Memory Yet Green: The Autobiography of Isaac Asimov, 1920–1954 (Doubleday)
- Extraterrestrial Civilizations (Crown)
- How Did We Find Out About Our Human Roots? † (Walker)
- The Road to Infinity (Doubleday)
- A Choice of Catastrophes (Simon & Schuster)
- Isaac Asimov's Book of Facts (Grosset & Dunlap)
- How Did We Find Out About Antarctica?† (Walker)
- The Threats of Our World

=== 1980 ===
- Casebook of the Black Widowers* (Doubleday)
- How Did We Find Out About Oil?† (Walker)
- In Joy Still Felt: The Autobiography of Isaac Asimov, 1954–1978 (Doubleday)
- How Did We Find Out About Coal?† (Walker)

=== 1981 ===
- In the Beginning: Science Faces God in the Book of Genesis (Crown/Stonesong Press)
- Asimov on Science Fiction (Doubleday)
- Venus, Near Neighbor of the Sun (Lothrop, Lee, & Shepard)
- Three by Asimov* (Targ)
- How Did We Find Out About Solar Power?† (Walker)
- How Did We Find Out About Volcanoes?† (Walker)
- Visions of the Universe (The Cosmos Store); co-written with Kazuaki Iwasaki
- The Sun Shines Bright (Doubleday)
- Change! Seventy-one Glimpses of the Future (Houghton Mifflin)
- A Grossery of Limericks (W. W. Norton)

=== 1982 ===
- How Did We Find Out About Life in the Deep Sea?† (Walker)
- The Complete Robot* (Doubleday)
- Exploring the Earth and the Cosmos (Crown)
- How Did We Find Out About the Beginning of Life?† (Walker)
- Isaac Asimov Presents Superquiz (Dembner Books)
- Foundation's Edge* (Doubleday)
- How Did We Find Out About the Universe?† (Walker)

=== 1983 ===
- Counting the Eons (Doubleday)
- The Winds of Change and Other Stories* (Doubleday)
- The Roving Mind (Prometheus Books)
- The Measure of the Universe (Harper & Row)
- The Union Club Mysteries* (Doubleday)
- Norby, the Mixed-up Robot*† (Walker)
- The Robots of Dawn* (Doubleday)
- How Did We Find Out About Genes?† (Walker)
- Isaac Asimov Presents Superquiz II ( Dembner Books)

=== 1984 ===
- X Stands for Unknown (Doubleday)
- Norby's Other Secret*† (Walker)
- How Did We Find Out About Computers?† (Walker)
- Opus 300 (Houghton Mifflin)
- Banquets of the Black Widowers* (Doubleday)
- Isaac Asimov's Limericks for Children† (Caedmon)
- How Did We Find Out About Robots? † (Walker)

=== 1985 ===
- Asimov's Guide to Halley's Comet (Walker)
- The Exploding Suns: The Secrets of the Supernovas (E. P. Dutton)
- Norby and the Lost Princess*† (Walker)
- How Did We Find Out About the Atmosphere?† (Walker)
- Living in the Future (Harmony House)
- Robots: Machines In Man's Image (Harmony House)
- The Edge of Tomorrow* (Tor/Tom Doherty Associates)
- The Subatomic Monster (Doubleday)
- The Disappearing Man and Other Mysteries* (Walker)
- Robots and Empire* (Doubleday)
- Norby and the Invaders*† (Walker)
- It's Such a Beautiful Day* (Creative Education)
- How Did We Find Out About DNA?† (Walker)

=== 1986 ===
- The Dangers of Intelligence and Other Science Essays (Houghton Mifflin)
- The Alternate Asimovs* (Doubleday)
- How Did We Find Out About the Speed of Light?† (Walker)
- Futuredays: A Nineteenth-Century Vision of the Year 2000 (Henry Holt)
- Science Fiction by Asimov* (Davis Publications)
- The Best Science Fiction of Isaac Asimov* (Doubleday)
- The Best Mysteries of Isaac Asimov* (Doubleday)
- Foundation and Earth* (Doubleday)
- Robot Dreams* (Byron Preiss)
- Norby and the Queen's Necklace*† (Walker)

=== 1987 ===
- Far as Human Eye Could See: Essays on Science (Doubleday)
- How Did We Find Out About Blood?† (Walker)
- Past, Present, and Future (Prometheus Books)
- Isaac Asimov Presents Superquiz III (Dembner Books)
- How Did We Find Out About Sunshine? † (Walker)
- How to Enjoy Writing: A Book of Aid and Comfort (Walker)
- Norby Finds a Villain*† (Walker)
- Fantastic Voyage II: Destination Brain* (Doubleday)
- How Did We Find Out About the Brain?† (Walker)
- Did Comets Kill the Dinosaurs?† (Gareth Stevens, Inc)
- Beginnings: The Story of Origins of Mankind, Life, the Earth, the Universe (Walker)
- Other Worlds of Isaac Asimov* (Avenel)

=== 1988 ===
- How Did We Find Out About Superconductivity?† (Walker)
- The Relativity of Wrong (Doubleday)
- Prelude to Foundation* (Doubleday)
- The Asteroids† (Gareth Stevens, Inc)
- The Earth's Moon† (Gareth Stevens, Inc)
- Mars: Our Mysterious Neighbor† (Gareth Stevens, Inc)
- Our Milky Way and Other Galaxies† (Gareth Stevens, Inc)
- Quasars, Pulsars, and Black Holes† (Gareth Stevens, Inc)
- Rockets, Probes, and Satellites† (Gareth Stevens, Inc)
- Our Solar System† (Gareth Stevens, Inc)
- The Sun† (Gareth Stevens, Inc)
- Uranus: The Sideways Planet† (Gareth Stevens, Inc)
- History of Biology [A chart] (Carolina Biological Suppls.)
- Azazel* (Doubleday)
- Isaac Asimov's Science Fiction and Fantasy Story-a-Month 1989 Calendar (Pomegranate Calendars & Bks)
- Saturn: The Ringed Beauty† (Gareth Stevens, Inc)
- How Was the Universe Born?† (Gareth Stevens, Inc)
- Earth: Our Home Base† (Gareth Stevens, Inc)
- Ancient Astronomy† (Gareth Stevens, Inc)
- Unidentified Flying Objects† (Gareth Stevens, Inc; Series: Isaac Asimov's Library of the Universe)
- The Space Spotter's Guide† (Gareth Stevens, Inc)
- Norby Down to Earth*† (Walker)

=== 1989 ===
- How Did We Find Out About Microwaves?† (Walker)
- Asimov's Galaxy: Reflections on Science Fiction (Doubleday)
- All the Troubles of the World* (Creative Education)
- Franchise* (Creative Education)
- Robbie* (Creative Education)
- Sally* (Creative Education)
- Is There Life on Other Planets?† (Gareth Stevens, Inc)
- Science Fiction, Science Fact† (Gareth Stevens, Inc)
- Mercury: The Quick Planet† (Gareth Stevens, Inc)
- Space Garbage† (Gareth Stevens, Inc)
- Jupiter: The Spotted Giant† (Gareth Stevens, Inc)
- The Birth and Death of Stars† (Gareth Stevens, Inc)
- The Asimov Chronicles: Fifty Years of Isaac Asimov* (Dark Harvest)
- The History of Mathematics [a chart] (Carolina Biological Suppls.)
- Think About Space: Where Have We Been and Where Are We Going? (Walker; Series: The Think Series), with Frank White
- Isaac Asimov Presents Superquiz IV (Dembner Books)
- The Tyrannosaurus Prescription: and One Hundred Other Science Essays (Prometheus Books)
- Asimov on Science: A 30 Year Retrospective 1959–1989 (Doubleday)
- Nemesis* (Doubleday)
- Asimov's Chronology of Science and Discovery (Harper & Row)
- How Did We Find Out About Photosynthesis?† (Walker)
- The Complete Science Fair Handbooks (Scott Foresman & Co)
- Little Treasury of Dinosaurs† (5 book set) (Outlet)
  - Giant Dinosaurs†
  - Armored Dinosaurs†
  - Small Dinosaurs†
  - Sea Reptiles and Flying Reptiles†
  - Meat-Eating Dinosaurs and Horned Dinosaurs†
- Norby and Yobo's Great Adventure*† (Walker)
- Mythology and the Universe† (Gareth Stevens, Inc)
- Colonizing the Planets and the Stars† (Gareth Stevens, Inc)
- Astronomy Today† (Gareth Stevens, Inc)
- Pluto: A Double Planet?† (Gareth Stevens, Inc)
- Piloted Space Flights† (Gareth Stevens, Inc)
- Comets and Meteors† (Gareth Stevens, Inc)

=== 1990 ===
- Puzzles of the Black Widowers* (Doubleday)
- Norby and the Oldest Dragon*† (Walker)
- Frontiers: New Discoveries About Man and His Planet, Outer Space and the Universe (E. P. Dutton/Truman)
- Out of the Everywhere: Thoughts on Science from the Master (Doubleday)
- Robot Visions* (Byron Preiss)
- How Did We Find Out About Lasers?† (Walker)
- Neptune: The Farthest Giant† (Gareth Stevens, Inc; Series: Isaac Asimov's Library of the Universe)
- Venus: A Shrouded Mystery† (Gareth Stevens, Inc; Series: Isaac Asimov's Library of the Universe)
- The World's Space Programs† (Gareth Stevens, Inc; Series: Isaac Asimov's Library of the Universe)
- Nightfall* (Doubleday); co-written with Robert Silverberg
- The Complete Stories Volume 1* (Doubleday)
- How Did We Find Out About Neptune?† (Walker)
- The March of the Millennia: A Key to Looking at History (Walker), with Frank White
- Cal: A Short Story Written Exclusively for Members of the Isaac Asimov Collection* (Doubleday)

=== 1991 ===
- Norby and the Court Jester*† (Walker)
- The March of the Millennia: A Key to Looking at History (Walker)
- The Secret of the Universe (Doubleday)
- How Did We Find Out About Pluto? † (Walker)
- Atom: Journey Across the Subatomic Cosmos (E. P. Dutton/Truman)
- Our Angry Earth: A Ticking Ecological Bomb (Tor); co-written with Frederik Pohl (2018 edition includes intro/afterword by Kim Stanley Robinson)
- Why Do We Have Different Seasons?† (Gareth Stevens, Inc)
- Is Our Planet Warming Up? † (Gareth Stevens, Inc)
- Why Is the Air Dirty? † (Gareth Stevens, Inc)
- Why Are Whales Vanishing?† (Gareth Stevens, Inc)
- Where Does Garbage Go? † (Gareth Stevens, Inc; Series: Ask Isaac Asimov)
- What Causes Acid Rain? † (Gareth Stevens, Inc)
- What Is a Shooting Star?† (Gareth Stevens, Inc)
- Why Do Stars Twinkle?† (Gareth Stevens, Inc)
- Why Does the Moon Change Shape?† (Gareth Stevens, Inc)
- What Is an Eclipse?† (Gareth Stevens, Inc)
- Isaac Asimov's Guide to Earth and Space (Random House)
- Asimov's Chronology of the World (HarperCollins)
- Christopher Columbus: Navigator to the New World† (Gareth Stevens, Inc; Series: Isaac Asimov's Pioneers of Science and Exploration)
- Ferdinand Magellan: Opening the Door to World Exploration† (Gareth Stevens, Inc; Series: Isaac Asimov's Pioneers of Science and Exploration)
- The History of Chemistry [a chart]

=== 1992 ===
- The Ugly Little Boy* (Doubleday); co-written with Robert Silverberg
- The Complete Stories, Volume 2* (Doubleday)
- Why Are Some Beaches Oily?† (Gareth Stevens, Inc)
- Why Are Animals Endangered?† (Gareth Stevens, Inc; Series: Ask Isaac Asimov)
- Why Are the Rain Forests Vanishing? † (Gareth Stevens, Inc)
- Why Does Litter Cause Problems?† (Gareth Stevens, Inc)
- Asimov Laughs Again: More Than 700 Favorite Jokes, Limericks, and Anecdotes (HarperCollins)
- What's Happening to the Ozone Layer? † (Gareth Stevens, Inc)

=== 1993 ===
- Forward the Foundation* (Doubleday)
- The Positronic Man* (Doubleday); co-written with Robert Silverberg
- The Future in Space† (Gareth Stevens, Inc; Series: Isaac Asimov's Library of the Universe), with Greg Walz-Chojnacki
- Frontiers II: More Recent Discoveries About Life, Earth, Space, and the Universe (E. P. Dutton/Truman), with Janet Asimov

=== 1994 ===
- I. Asimov: A Memoir (Doubleday)

=== 1995 ===
- Gold: The Final Science Fiction Collection* (HarperPrism)
- Yours, Isaac Asimov (Doubleday)

=== 1996 ===
- Magic: The Final Fantasy Collection* (HarperPrism)

=== 2002 ===
- It's Been a Good Life, condensation of three autobiographical volumes edited by Asimov's widow

=== 2003 ===
- The Return of the Black Widowers*

== As editor or annotator ==
=== 1962 ===
- The Hugo Winners* (Doubleday)

=== 1963 ===
- Fifty Short Science Fiction Tales* (Collier)

=== 1966 ===
- Tomorrow's Children: Eighteen Tales of Fantasy and Science Fiction* (Doubleday)

=== 1971 ===
- Where Do We Go from Here? * (Doubleday)
- The Hugo Winners, Volume II* (Doubleday)

=== 1972 ===
- Asimov's Annotated ‘Don Juan’ (Doubleday)

=== 1973 ===
- Nebula Award Stories Eight* (Harper & Row)

=== 1974 ===
- Before the Golden Age: A Science Fiction Anthology of the 1930s* (Doubleday)
- Asimov's Annotated ‘Paradise Lost’ (Doubleday)

=== 1977 ===
- Familiar Poems, Annotated (Doubleday)
- The Hugo Winners, Volume III* (Doubleday)

=== 1978 ===
- One Hundred Great Science Fiction Short-Short Stories* (Doubleday)

=== 1979 ===
- Isaac Asimov Presents The Great SF Stories 1 (1939)* (DAW Books)
- Isaac Asimov Presents The Great SF Stories 2 (1940)* (DAW Books)
- The Science Fictional Solar System* (Harper & Row)
- The Thirteen Crimes of Science Fiction* (Doubleday)1979

=== 1980 ===
- The Future in Question* (Fawcett Crest)
- Isaac Asimov Presents The Great SF Stories 3 (1941)* (DAW Books)
- Who Done It? * (Houghton Mifflin)
- Space Mail* (Fawcett Crest)
- Microcosmic Tales: 100 Wondrous Science Fiction Short-Short Stories* (Taplinger)
- Isaac Asimov Presents The Great SF Stories 4 (1942)* (DAW Books)
- The Seven Deadly Sins of Science Fiction* (Fawcett Crest)
- The Annotated ‘Gulliver's Travels’ (Clarkson N. Potter)

=== 1981 ===
- The Future I* (Fawcett Crest)
- Isaac Asimov Presents The Great SF Stories 5 (1943)* (DAW Books)
- Catastrophes!* (Fawcett Crest)
- Isaac Asimov Presents the Best Science Fiction of the 19th Century* (Beaufort Books)
- The Seven Cardinal Virtues of Science Fiction* (Fawcett Crest)
- Fantastic Creatures: An Anthology of Fantasy and Science Fiction* (Franklin Watts)
- Raintree Reading Series I* (Raintree)
  - Travels Through Time*
  - Thinking Machines*
  - Wild Inventions*
  - After The End*
- Miniature Mysteries: One Hundred Malicious Little Mystery Stories* (Taplinger)
- The Twelve Crimes of Christmas* (Avon)
- Isaac Asimov Presents The Great SF Stories 6 (1944)* (DAW Books)

=== 1982 ===
- Space Mail, Volume II* (Fawcett Crest)
- Tantalizing Locked Room Mysteries* (Walker)
- TV: 2000* (Fawcett Crest)
- Laughing Space* (Houghton Mifflin)
- Speculations* (Houghton Mifflin)
- Flying Saucers* (Fawcett Crest)
- Raintree Reading Series II* (Raintree)
  - Earth Invaded*
  - Mad Scientists*
  - Mutants*
  - Tomorrow's TV*
- Dragon Tales* (Fawcett Crest)
- The Big Apple Mysteries* (Avon)
- Isaac Asimov Presents The Great SF Stories 7 (1945)* (DAW Books)
- The Last Man on Earth* (Fawcett Crest)
- Science Fiction A to Z: A Dictionary of Great Science Fiction Themes* (Houghton Mifflin)
- Isaac Asimov Presents the Best Fantasy of the 19th Century* (Beaufort Books)
- Isaac Asimov Presents The Great SF Stories 8 (1946)* (DAW Books)
- Isaac Asimov Presents The Great SF Stories 9 (1947)* (DAW Books)

=== 1983 ===
- Show Business Is Murder* (Avon)
- Hallucination Orbit: Psychology In Science Fiction* (Farrar, Straus, & Giroux), with Charles G. Waugh and Martin Harry Greenberg
- Caught In the Organ Draft: Biology in Science Fiction* (Farrar, Straus, & Giroux)
- The Science Fiction Weight-Loss Book* (Crown)
- Isaac Asimov Presents the Best Horror and Supernatural Stories of the 19th Century* (Beaufort Books)
- Starships: Stories Beyond the Boundaries of the Universe* (Fawcett Crest)
- Isaac Asimov Presents The Great SF Stories 10 (1948)* (DAW Books)
- Thirteen Horrors of Halloween* (Avon)
- Creations: The Quest for Origins in Story and Science* (Crown)
- Wizards* (NAL)
- Those Amazing Electronic Thinking Machines! An Anthology of Robot and Computer Stories* (Franklin Watts)
- Computer Crimes and Capers* (Academy Chicago Pub.)
- Intergalactic Empires* (NAL)

=== 1984 ===
- Machines That Think: The Best Science Stories About Robots and Computers* (Henry Holt & Co); edited with Patricia S. Warrick and Martin H. Greenburg.
  - Reprinted in 1992 by Wings Books as War with the Robots.
- One Hundred Great Fantasy Short-Short Stories* (Doubleday)
- Raintree Reading Series 3* (Raintree)
  - Bug Awful*
  - Children Of The Future*
  - The Immortals*
  - Time Warps*
- Isaac Asimov Presents The Great SF Stories 11 (1949)* (DAW Books)
- Witches* (NAL)
- Murder on the Menu* (Avon)
- Young Mutants* (Harper & Row)
- Isaac Asimov Presents the Best Science Fiction Firsts* (Beaufort Books)
- The Science Fictional Olympics* (NAL)
- Fantastic Reading: Stories & Activities for Grade 5–8* (Scott Foresman & Co.)
- Election Day 2084: Science Fiction Stories on the Politics of the Future* (Prometheus Books)
- Isaac Asimov Presents The Great SF Stories 12 (1950) (DAW Books)
- Young Extraterrestrials* (Harper & Row)
- Sherlock Holmes Through Time and Space* (Bluejay Books)
- Supermen* (NAL)
- Baker's Dozen: 13 Short Fantasy Novels* (Crown)

=== 1985 ===
- Cosmic Knights* (NAL)
- The Hugo Winners, Volume IV* (Doubleday)
- Young Monsters* (Harper & Row)
- Spells* (NAL)
- Great Science Fiction Stories by the World's Great Scientists* (Donald I. Fine)
- Isaac Asimov Presents The Great SF Stories 13 (1951)* (DAW Books)
- Amazing Stories: Sixty Years of the Best Science Fiction* (TSR, Inc.)
- Young Ghosts* (Harper & Row)
- Baker's Dozen: Thirteen Short Science Fiction Novels* (Crown)
- Giants* (NAL)

=== 1986 ===
- Isaac Asimov Presents The Great SF Stories 14 (1952)* (DAW Books)
- Comets* (NAL)
- Young Star Travelers* (Harper & Row)
- The Hugo Winners, Volume V* (Doubleday)
- Mythical Beasties* (NAL)
- Tin Stars* (NAL)
- Magical Wishes* (NAL)
- Isaac Asimov Presents The Great SF Stories 15 (1953)* (DAW Books)
- The Twelve Frights of Christmas* (Avon)

=== 1987 ===
- Isaac Asimov Presents The Great SF Stories 16 (1954)* (DAW Books)
- Young Witches and Warlocks* (Harper & Row)
- Devils* (NAL)
- Hound Dunnit* (Carroll & Graf)
- Space Shuttles* (NAL)

=== 1988 ===
- Isaac Asimov's Book of Science and Nature Quotations (Blue Cliff)
- Atlantis* (NAL)
- Isaac Asimov Presents The Great SF Stories 17 (1955)* (DAW Books)
- Asimov's Annotated Gilbert and Sullivan (Doubleday)
- Encounters* (Headline)
- Isaac Asimov Presents the Best Crime Stories of the 19th Century* (Dembner Books)
- The Mammoth Book of Classic Science Fiction: Short Novels of the 1930s* (Carroll & Graf)
- Monsters* (NAL)
- Isaac Asimov Presents The Great SF Stories 18 (1956)* (DAW Books)
- Ghosts* (NAL)
- The Sport of Crime* (Lynx)

=== 1989 ===
- Isaac Asimov Presents The Great SF Stories 19 (1957)* (DAW Books)
- Isaac Asimov Presents Tales of the Occult* (Prometheus Books)
- Purr-fect Crime* (Lynx)
- Robots* (NAL)
- Visions of Fantasy: Tales from the Masters* (Doubleday)
- Curses (NAL)
- The New Hugo Winners* (Wynwood Press)
- Senior Sleuths: A Large Print Anthology of Mysteries and Puzzlers* (G. K. Hall & Co.)
- The Mammoth Book of Golden Age Science Fiction: Short Novels of the 1940s* (Carroll & Graf)

=== 1990 ===
- Cosmic Critiques: How & Why Ten Science Fiction Stories Work* (Writer's Digest Books)
- Isaac Asimov Presents The Great SF Stories 20 (1958)* (DAW Books)
- Isaac Asimov Presents The Great SF Stories 21 (1959)* (DAW Books)
- Robots from Asimov's* (Davis Publications)
- Invasions* (Roc/Penguin Books)
- The Mammoth Book of Vintage Science Fiction: Short Novels of the 1950s* (Carroll & Graf)

=== 1991 ===
- Isaac Asimov Presents The Great SF Stories 22 (1960)* (DAW Books)
- Isaac Asimov Presents The Great SF Stories 23 (1961)* (DAW Books)
- Faeries (Roc/Penguin Books)
- The Mammoth Book of New World Science Fiction: Short Novels of the 1960s* (Carroll & Graf)

=== 1992 ===
- Isaac Asimov Presents The Great SF Stories 24 (1962)* (DAW Books)
- The New Hugo Winners, Volume II* (Baen Books)
- Isaac Asimov Presents The Great SF Stories 25 (1963)* (DAW Books)
- The Mammoth Book of Fantastic Science Fiction: Short Novels of the 1970s* (Carroll & Graf)

=== 1993 ===
- The Mammoth Book of Modern Science Fiction: Short Novels of the 1980s* (Carroll & Graf)

== Books with introduction by Asimov ==
- Boardman, Barrington (1989), Flappers, Bootleggers, "Typhoid Mary" and the Bomb: An Anecdotal History of the U.S. from 1923-1945 (Harpercollins)
  - Reissued in 1992 as Isaac Asimov Presents From Harding to Hiroshima: An Anecdotal History of the United States from 1923 to 1945 (Dembner Books)

== See also ==
- Isaac Asimov bibliography (categorical)
- Isaac Asimov bibliography (alphabetical)
