= The Wall Around the World =

Science fiction short story

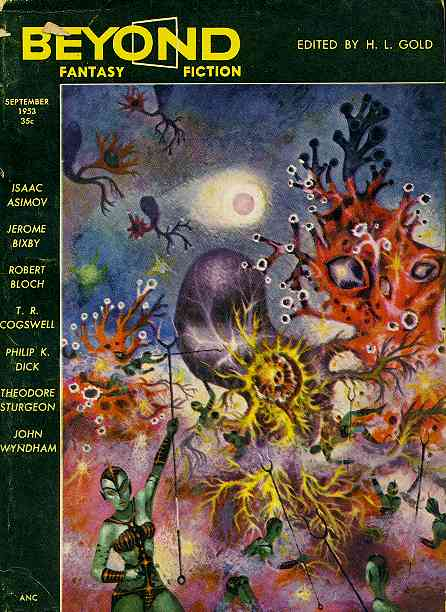
"The Wall Around the World" was originally published in the September 1953 issue of Beyond.

"The Wall Around the World" is a science fiction short story by American writer Theodore Cogswell. It was first published in the magazine Beyond Fantasy Fiction in 1953 and provided the title for Cogswell's first short fiction collection, published in 1962. It is set in a world where magic is taken for granted and technology is banned and feared.

== Plot summary ==
Thirteen-year-old Porgie Mills, an orphan raised by his aunt and uncle, is fascinated by the impassable "wall around the world". It is a barrier higher than any broomstick can fly. His obsession distracts him from his schoolwork in magic. No amount of discipline can diminish the boy's interest. His schoolteacher, Mr Wickens, warns Porgie not to follow in the footsteps of his father, who dabbled in forbidden technology until the dreaded "Black Man" took him away. Porgie, inspired by a sketch by his father, builds a crude glider in secret.

On his 14th birthday, Porgie launches his contraption. He uses his broomstick to provide additional lift. While aloft, Porgie spots his bullying cousin "Bull Pup" flying below and takes the opportunity to taunt him. An aerial fight ensues and Porgie's glider gets damaged.

With his foe defeated, Porgie sets his sights on the Wall. Eventually his broomstick stops working, but Porgie manages to use updrafts to keep his glider rising until he reaches the Wall's top, just before his glider breaks up. Atop the Wall, he sees the Black Man flying toward him. He panics and falls off the Wall. He is caught by the Black Man, who reveals himself as Wickens. The schoolteacher tells Porgie the truth: the world outside is based on technology and lacking in magic. The Wall was built and people put inside in order to develop their psychic abilities. Wickens takes Porgie to be reunited with his father.

== Reception ==
It was nominated for the 1953 Retro-Hugo Award for Best Novelette. A 62nd World Science Fiction Convention (Noreascon 4) article praised the story:

1953 was also a year in which a number of underappreciated writers produced some very good work. Charles L. Harness wrote his gorgeous story "The Rose", and Theodore Cogswell wrote "The Wall Around the World".

== Publication history ==
May be incomplete.

- Beyond Fantasy Fiction (1953)

Anthologies:

- Beyond the Barriers of Space and Time (1954), Judith Merril (ed.)
- The Wall Around the World (1962), Theodore Cogswell
- Yet More Penguin Science Fiction (1964), Brian Aldiss (ed.)
- Worlds of Wonder (1969), Harry Harrison (ed.)
- The Penguin Science Fiction Omnibus (1973), Brian Aldiss (ed.)
- The Wall Around the World and Other Science Fiction Stories (1979), Susan Morris (ed.)
- Wizards (1983), Isaac Asimov, Martin H. Greenberg and Charles G. Waugh (eds.)
- The Great SF Stories #15 (1953) (1986), Isaac Asimov and Martin H. Greenberg (eds.)
- The Mammoth Book of Fantasy (2001), Mike Ashley (ed.)

The story has also been translated into:

- German ("Die Mauer um die Welt", 1963)
- Dutch ("De muur rondom de wereld", 1978)
- Italian ("Il muro intorno al mondo", 1987)
- Hungarian ("Fal a világ körül", 1988)
- Portuguese ("A muralha ao redor do mundo", 1990)
