= Isaac Asimov's Magical Worlds of Fantasy =

The first volume, Wizards, 1983, cover art by Kinuko Kraft.

Isaac Asimov's Magical Worlds of Fantasy is a series of twelve themed paperback fantasy and science fiction anthologies edited by Isaac Asimov, Martin H. Greenberg and Charles G. Waugh, a companion set to the ten volume Isaac Asimov's Wonderful Worlds of Science Fiction, produced by the same editors. It was published by Signet/New American Library from 1983 to 1991. Volumes 1 and 2 were also issued in hardcover in an omnibus collection titled Isaac Asimov's Magical Worlds of Fantasy: Witches & Wizards.

== Summary ==
Each volume in the series featured stories devoted to a different fantastic theme, as indicated in the individual volume titles. Most volumes also included an introduction by Asimov.

== The series ==
1. Wizards (1983)
2. Witches (1984)
3. Cosmic Knights (1985)
4. Spells (1985)
5. Giants (1985)
6. Mythical Beasties (1986)
7. Magical Wishes (1986)
8. Devils (1987)
9. Atlantis (1988)
10. Ghosts (1988)
11. Curses (1989)
12. Faeries (1991)

== Reception ==
Tom Easton in Analog Science Fiction/Science Fact notes that "Asimov, Greenberg, and Waugh have anthologized nearly every story ever published in the realms of SF and fantasy. Or so it seems. But their task is worthy. They rescue from oblivion, they replace moldering pulps, they package attractively, they impose unity with the themes of their books, and they adorn with the Master's [Asimov's] comments. For Signet, they have been assembling books that center each on some theme of fantasy—giants, witches, wizards, and so on."

== See also ==
- Isaac Asimov's Wonderful Worlds of Science Fiction
