= UFOs: The Greatest Stories =

1996 anthology of science fiction short stories and novels

- Editor: Martin H. Greenberg
- Language: English
- Genre: Science fiction
- Publisher: MJF Books
- Publication date: 1996
- Publication place: United States
- Media type: Print (Paperback)
- Pages: 310 p.
- ISBN: 1-56731-086-9
- OCLC: 35325090
- Dewey Decimal: 813/.0876208 20
- LC Class: PS648.S3 U328 1996

UFOs: The Greatest Stories is a 1996 anthology of science fiction short stories and novels revolving around UFOs. It was edited by Martin H. Greenberg.

== Contents ==
Title	Author
"All the Universe in a Mason Jar"	Joe Haldeman
"The Edge of the Sea"	Algis Budrys
"Fear is a Business"	Theodore Sturgeon
"Sightings at Twin Mounds"	Gene Wolfe
"The Silly Season"	C.M. Kornbluth
"Or Else"	Henry Kuttner
"The Venus Hunters"	J. G. Ballard
"Exposure"	Eric Frank Russell
"What is This Thing Called Love?"	Isaac Asimov
Shadows in the Sun	Chad Oliver
Seed of the Gods	Zach Hughes
