= Isaac Asimov Presents The Great SF Stories 18 (1956) =

- First edition
- Editors: Isaac Asimov; Martin H. Greenberg
- Cover artist: Robert André
- Language: English
- Series: Isaac Asimov Presents The Great SF Stories
- Genre: Science fiction
- Publisher: DAW Books
- Publication date: August 1988
- Publication place: United States
- Media type: Print (hardback & paperback)
- Preceded by: Isaac Asimov Presents The Great SF Stories 17 (1955)
- Followed by: Isaac Asimov Presents The Great SF Stories 19 (1957)

Isaac Asimov Presents The Great SF Stories 18 (1956) is the eighteenth volume of Isaac Asimov Presents The Great SF Stories, which is a series of short story collections, edited by Isaac Asimov and Martin H. Greenberg, which attempts to list the great science fiction stories from the Golden Age of Science Fiction. They date the Golden Age as beginning in 1939 and lasting until 1963. This volume was originally published by DAW books in August 1988.

== Contents ==
- "Brightside Crossing" by Alan E. Nourse
- "Clerical Error" by Mark Clifton
- "Silent Brother" by Algis Budrys
- "The Country of the Kind" by Damon Knight
- "Exploration Team" by Murray Leinster
- "Rite of Passage" by Henry Kuttner and C. L. Moore
- "The Man Who Came Early" by Poul Anderson
- "A Work of Art" by James Blish
- "Horrer Howce" by Margaret St. Clair
- "Compounded Interest" by Mack Reynolds
- "The Doorstop" by Reginald Bretnor
- "The Last Question" by Isaac Asimov
- "Stranger Station" by Damon Knight
- "2066: Election Day" by Michael Shaara
- "And Now the News..." by Theodore Sturgeon
