= Isaac Asimov Presents The Great SF Stories 17 (1955) =

- First edition
- Editors: Isaac Asimov; Martin H. Greenberg
- Cover artist: Jim Burns
- Language: English
- Series: Isaac Asimov Presents The Great SF Stories
- Genre: Science fiction
- Publisher: DAW Books
- Publication date: January 1988
- Publication place: United States
- Media type: Print (hardback & paperback)
- Preceded by: Isaac Asimov Presents The Great SF Stories 16 (1954)
- Followed by: Isaac Asimov Presents The Great SF Stories 18 (1956)

Isaac Asimov Presents The Great SF Stories 17 (1955) is the seventeenth volume of Isaac Asimov Presents The Great SF Stories, which is a series of short story collections, edited by Isaac Asimov and Martin H. Greenberg, which attempts to list the great science fiction stories from the Golden Age of Science Fiction. They date the Golden Age as beginning in 1939 and lasting until 1963. This volume was originally published by DAW books in January 1988.

== Contents ==
- "The Tunnel Under the World" by Frederik Pohl
- "The Darfsteller" by Walter M. Miller, Jr.
- "The Cave of Night" by James E. Gunn
- "Grandpa" by James H. Schmitz
- "Who?" by Theodore Sturgeon
- "The Short Ones" by Raymond E. Banks
- "Captive Market" by Philip K. Dick
- "Allamagoosa" by Eric Frank Russell
- "The Vanishing American" by Charles Beaumont
- "The Game of Rat and Dragon" by Cordwainer Smith
- "The Star" by Arthur C. Clarke
- "Nobody Bothers Gus" by Algis Budrys
- "Delenda Est" by Poul Anderson
- "Dreaming Is a Private Thing" by Isaac Asimov
