= Isaac Asimov Presents The Great SF Stories 21 (1959) =

- First edition
- Editors: Isaac Asimov; Martin H. Greenberg
- Cover artist: Robin Hiddon
- Language: English
- Series: Isaac Asimov Presents The Great SF Stories
- Genre: Science fiction
- Publisher: DAW Books
- Publication date: June 1990
- Publication place: United States
- Media type: Print (hardback & paperback)
- Preceded by: Isaac Asimov Presents The Great SF Stories 20 (1958)
- Followed by: Isaac Asimov Presents The Great SF Stories 22 (1960)

Isaac Asimov Presents The Great SF Stories 21 (1959) is the twenty-first volume of Isaac Asimov Presents The Great SF Stories, which is a series of short story collections, edited by Isaac Asimov and Martin H. Greenberg, which attempts to list the great science fiction stories from the Golden Age of Science Fiction. They date the Golden Age as beginning in 1939 and lasting until 1963. This volume was originally published by DAW books in June 1990.

== Stories ==
- "Make a Prison" by Lawrence Block
- "The Wind People" by Marion Zimmer Bradley
- "No, No, Not Rogov!" by Cordwainer Smith
- "What Rough Beast?" by Damon Knight
- "The Alley Man" by Philip José Farmer
- "Day at the Beach" by Carol Emshwiller
- "The Malted Milk Monster" by William Tenn
- "The World of Heart's Desire" by Robert Sheckley
- "The Man Who Lost the Sea" by Theodore Sturgeon
- "A Death in the House" by Clifford D. Simak
- "The Pi Man" by Alfred Bester
- "Multum in Parvo" by Jack Sharkey
- "What Now, Little Man?" by Mark Clifton
- "Adrift on the Policy Level" by Chandler Davis
