= Asimov on Science Fiction =

1981 book by Isaac Asimov

Cover of the first UK edition, published by Granada.

Asimov on Science Fiction (ISBN 0-586-05840-0) is a 1981 non-fiction work by American writer and scientist Isaac Asimov. It is a collection of short essays dealing with various aspects of science fiction. Many of the essays are (slightly edited versions of) editorials from Isaac Asimov's Science Fiction Magazine.

== Contents ==
Asimov wrote forewords to the essays in order to bind the collection together and grouped them in the following sections:

- Science Fiction in General
- The Writing of Science Fiction
- The Predictions of Science Fiction
- The History of Science Fiction
- Science Fiction Writers
- Science Fiction Fans
- Science Fiction Reviews
- Science Fiction and I

== Reception ==
Dave Langford reviewed Asimov on Science Fiction for White Dwarf #47, and stated that "If you enjoy Asimov's good-humoured essay style, and don't mind bittiness and repetition, this is an interesting collection to dip into."

== Reviews ==
- Review by Gene DeWeese (1981) in Science Fiction Review, Winter 1981
- Review by Tom Staicar (1982) in Amazing Science Fiction Stories, January 1982
- Review by Jim England (1984) in Vector 120
- Review by Joseph Nicholas (1984) in Paperback Inferno, #51
