= TV: 2000 =

- Editors: Isaac Asimov; Charles G. Waugh; Martin H. Greenberg
- Language: English
- Genre: Science fiction anthology
- Publisher: Fawcett Crest Books
- Publication date: 1982
- Publication place: United States
- Media type: Print (Paperback)
- Pages: 352 p.
- ISBN: 0-449-24493-8
- OCLC: 8272488

TV: 2000 is a 1982 anthology of science fiction short-stories revolving around television and its implications. Its editors are Isaac Asimov, Charles G. Waugh, and Martin H. Greenberg.

== Contents ==
=== Part I: The Control of TV ===
Theme	Title	Author
Government	"Now Inhale"	Eric Frank Russell
Network Executives	"Dreaming Is a Private Thing"	Isaac Asimov
Writers	"The Man Who Murdered Television"	Joseph Patrouch
Sponsors	"The Jester"	William Tenn
Special Interest Groups	"The Man Who Came Back"	Robert Silverberg
Viewers	"I See You"	Damon Knight

=== Part II: The Content of TV ===
Theme	Title	Author
Game Shows	"The Prize of Peril"	Robert Sheckley
Sports	"Home Team Advantage"	Jack C. Haldeman II
News	"Mercenary"	Mack Reynolds
Advertising	"Without Portfolio"	James E. Gunn
Series	"The Idea"	Barry N. Malzberg
Educational Programmes	"And Madly Teach"	Lloyd Biggle, Jr.

=== Part III: The Consequences of TV ===
Theme	Title	Author
Nostalgia	"What Time Is It?"	Jack C. Haldeman II
Shape Perceptions of Social Reality	"Interview"	Frank A. Javor
Affect Deviant Behaviour	"Cloak of Anarchy"	Larry Niven
Promote Information Overload	And Now the News	Theodore Sturgeon
Influence Values	"Very Proper Charlies"	Dean Ing
Spread Ideas	"Committee of the Whole"	Frank Herbert
