= Isaac Asimov Presents The Great SF Stories 19 (1957) =

- First edition
- Editors: Isaac Asimov; Martin H. Greenberg
- Cover artist: Ian Craig
- Language: English
- Series: Isaac Asimov Presents The Great SF Stories
- Genre: Science fiction
- Publisher: DAW Books
- Publication date: February 1989
- Publication place: United States
- Media type: Print (hardback & paperback)
- Preceded by: Isaac Asimov Presents The Great SF Stories 18 (1956)
- Followed by: Isaac Asimov Presents The Great SF Stories 20 (1958)

Isaac Asimov Presents The Great SF Stories 19 (1957) is the nineteenth volume of Isaac Asimov Presents The Great SF Stories, which is a series of short story collections, edited by Isaac Asimov and Martin H. Greenberg, which attempts to list the great science fiction stories from the Golden Age of Science Fiction. They date the Golden Age as beginning in 1939 and lasting until 1963. This volume was originally published by DAW books in February 1989.

== Contents ==
- "Strikebreaker" by Isaac Asimov
- "Omnilingual" by H. Beam Piper
- "The Mile-Long Spaceship" by Kate Wilhelm
- "Call Me Joe" by Poul Anderson
- "You Know Willie" by Theodore R. Cogswell
- "Hunting Machine" by Carol Emshwiller
- "World of a Thousand Colors" by Robert Silverberg
- "Let's Be Frank" by Brian W. Aldiss
- "The Cage" by A. Bertram Chandler
- "The Education of Tigress McCardle" by C. M. Kornbluth
- "The Tunesmith" by Lloyd Biggle, Jr.
- "A Loint of Paw" by Isaac Asimov
- "Game Preserve" by Rog Phillips
- "Soldier" by Harlan Ellison (later adapted into The Outer Limits 1964 episode "Soldier")
- "The Last Man Left in the Bar" by C. M. Kornbluth
