= Isaac Asimov Presents The Great SF Stories 22 (1960) =

- First edition
- Editors: Isaac Asimov; Martin H. Greenberg
- Cover artist: Angus McKie
- Language: English
- Series: Isaac Asimov Presents The Great SF Stories
- Genre: Science fiction
- Publisher: DAW Books
- Publication date: February 1991
- Publication place: United States
- Media type: Print (hardback & paperback)
- Preceded by: Isaac Asimov Presents The Great SF Stories 21 (1959)
- Followed by: Isaac Asimov Presents The Great SF Stories 23 (1961)

Isaac Asimov Presents The Great SF Stories 22 (1960) is an American science fiction anthology, the twenty-second volume in the Isaac Asimov Presents The Great SF Stories series, edited by Isaac Asimov and Martin H. Greenberg, which attempts to list the great science fiction stories from the Golden Age of Science Fiction. They date the Golden Age as beginning in 1939 and lasting until 1963. This volume was originally published by DAW books in February 1991.

== Stories ==
- “Mariana” by Fritz Leiber
- “The Day the Icicle Works Closed” by Frederik Pohl
- “The Fellow Who Married the Maxill Girl” by Ward Moore
- “Mine Own Ways” by Richard M. McKenna
- “Make Mine Homogenized” by Rick Raphael
- “The Lady Who Sailed the Soul” by Cordwainer Smith
- “I Remember Babylon” by Arthur C. Clarke
- “Chief” by Henry Slesar
- “Mind Partner” by Christopher Anvil
- "The Handler" by Damon Knight
- “The Voices of Time” by J. G. Ballard
