= Isaac Asimov Presents The Great SF Stories 20 (1958) =

- First edition
- Editors: Isaac Asimov; Martin H. Greenberg
- Cover artist: Robin Hiddon
- Language: English
- Series: Isaac Asimov Presents The Great SF Stories
- Genre: Science fiction
- Publisher: DAW Books
- Publication date: February 1990
- Publication place: United States
- Media type: Print (hardback & paperback)
- Preceded by: Isaac Asimov Presents The Great SF Stories 19 (1957)
- Followed by: Isaac Asimov Presents The Great SF Stories 21 (1959)

Isaac Asimov Presents The Great SF Stories 20 (1958) is the twentieth volume of Isaac Asimov Presents The Great SF Stories, which is a series of short story collections, edited by Isaac Asimov and Martin H. Greenberg, which attempts to list the great science fiction stories from the Golden Age of Science Fiction. They date the Golden Age as beginning in 1939 and lasting until 1963. This volume was originally published by DAW books in February 1990.

== Stories ==
1. The Last of the Deliverers by Poul Anderson
2. The Feeling of Power by Isaac Asimov
3. Poor Little Warrior! by Brian W. Aldiss
4. The Iron Chancellor by Robert Silverberg
5. The Prize of Peril by Robert Sheckley
6. Or All the Seas with Oysters by Avram Davidson
7. Two Dooms by C. M. Kornbluth
8. The Big Front Yard by Clifford D. Simak
9. The Burning of the Brain by Cordwainer Smith
10. The Yellow Pill by Rog Phillips
11. Unhuman Sacrifice by Katherine MacLean
12. The Immortals by James E. Gunn
