= The Science Fictional Solar System =

1979 anthology by Isaac Asimov

- Editors: Isaac Asimov; Charles G. Waugh; Martin H. Greenberg
- Language: English
- Genre: Science fiction
- Publisher: Harper & Row
- Publication date: 1979
- Publication place: United States
- Media type: Print
- Pages: 317 p.

The Science Fictional Solar System is a 1979 anthology of science fiction short-stories revolving around the Solar System. Its editors are Isaac Asimov, Charles G. Waugh, and Martin H. Greenberg.

== Contents ==
Setting	Title	Author
Sun	"The Weather on the Sun"	Theodore L. Thomas
Mercury	"Brightside Crossing"	Alan E. Nourse
Venus	"Prospector's Special"	Robert Sheckley
Earth	"Waterclap"	Isaac Asimov
Mars	"Hop-Friend"	Terry Carr
Asteroids	"Barnacle Bull"	Poul Anderson as Winston P. Sanders
Jupiter	"Bridge'"	James Blish
Saturn	"Saturn Rising"	Arthur C. Clarke
Uranus	"The Snowbank Orbit"	Fritz Leiber
Neptune	"One Sunday in Neptune"	Alexei Panshin
Pluto	"Wait It Out"	Larry Niven
Pluto	"Nikita Eisenhower Jones"	Robert F. Young
Comets	"The Comet, the Cairn and the Capsule"	Duncan Lunan
