= Giants (anthology) =

1985 science and fantasy fiction anthology

- Cover of first edition
- Editors: Isaac Asimov; Martin H. Greenberg; Charles G. Waugh
- Cover artist: Kinuko Y. Kraft
- Language: English
- Series: Isaac Asimov's Magical Worlds of Fantasy
- Genre: Fantasy and science fiction
- Publisher: Signet/New American Library
- Publication date: 1985
- Publication place: United States
- Media type: Print (paperback)
- Pages: 352
- ISBN: 0-451-13922-4
- Preceded by: Spells
- Followed by: Mythical Beasties

Giants is an anthology of themed fantasy and science fiction short stories on the subject of giants edited by Isaac Asimov, Martin H. Greenberg and Charles G. Waugh as the fifth volume in their Isaac Asimov's Magical Worlds of Fantasy series. It was first published in paperback by Signet/New American Library in November 1985. The first British edition was issued in trade paperback by Robinson in July 1987.

== Summary ==
The book collects twelve novellas, novelettes and short stories by various fantasy and science fiction authors, with an introduction by Asimov.

== Contents ==
- "Introduction: Giants in the Earth" (Isaac Asimov)
- "The Riddle of Ragnarok" (Theodore Sturgeon)
- "Straggler from Atlantis" (Manly Wade Wellman)
- "He Who Shrank" (Henry Hasse)
- "From the Dark Waters" (David Drake)
- "Small Lords" (Frederik Pohl)
- "The Mad Planet" (Murray Leinster)
- "Dreamworld" (Isaac Asimov)
- "The Thirty and One" (David H. Keller, M.D.)
- "The Law-Twister Shorty" (Gordon R. Dickson)
- "In the Lower Passage" (Harle Oren Cummins)
- "Cabin Boy" (Damon Knight)
- "The Colossus of Ylourgne" (Clark Ashton Smith)

== Reception ==
The anthology was reviewed by Don D'Ammassa in Science Fiction Chronicle #83, August 1986, Andy Sawyer in Paperback Inferno #68, 1987, Jon Wallace in Vector 140, 1987, and Antonio Bellomi in the Italian journal Star Trek, Luglio 1988.
