= Devils (anthology) =

- Cover of first edition
- Editors: Isaac Asimov; Martin H. Greenberg; Charles G. Waugh
- Cover artist: J. K. Potter
- Language: English
- Series: Isaac Asimov's Magical Worlds of Fantasy
- Genre: Fantasy and science fiction
- Publisher: Signet/New American Library
- Publication date: 1987
- Publication place: United States
- Media type: Print (paperback)
- Pages: 351
- ISBN: 0-451-14865-7
- Preceded by: Magical Wishes
- Followed by: Atlantis

Devils is an anthology of themed fantasy and science fiction short stories on the subject of devils or demons edited by Isaac Asimov, Martin H. Greenberg and Charles G. Waugh as the eighth volume in their Isaac Asimov's Magical Worlds of Fantasy series. It was first published in paperback by Signet/New American Library in June 1987. The first British edition was issued in trade paperback by Robinson in 1989.

== Summary ==
The book collects eighteen novellas, novelettes and short stories by various fantasy and science fiction authors, with an introduction by Asimov.

== Contents ==
- "The Devil" [introduction] (Isaac Asimov)
- "I'm Dangerous Tonight" (Cornell Woolrich)
- "The Devil in Exile" (Brian Cleeve)
- "The Cage" (Ray Russell)
- "The Tale of Ivan the Fool" (Leo Tolstoy)
- "The Shepherds" (Ruth Sawyer)
- "He Stepped on the Devil's Tail" (Winston K. Marks)
- "Rustle of Wings" (Fredric Brown)
- "That Hell-Bound Train" (Robert Bloch)
- "Added Inducement" (Robert F. Young)
- "The Devil and Daniel Webster" (Stephen Vincent Benét)
- "Colt .24" (Rick Hautala)
- "The Making of Revelation, Part I" (Philip José Farmer)
- "The Howling Man" (Charles Beaumont)
- "Trace" (Jerome Bixby)
- "Guardian Angel" (Arthur C. Clarke)
- "The Devil Was Sick" (Bruce Elliott)
- "Deal with the D.E.V.I.L." (Theodore R. Cogswell)
- "Dazed" (Theodore Sturgeon)

== Reception ==
The anthology was reviewed by Don D'Ammassa in Science Fiction Chronicle #96, September 1987, Alan Dorey in Vector 152, 1989, and Jon Wallace in Paperback Inferno #81, 1989.
