= Ghosts (anthology) =

1988 anthology

- Cover of first edition
- Editors: Isaac Asimov; Martin H. Greenberg; Charles G. Waugh
- Cover artist: J. K. Potter
- Language: English
- Series: Isaac Asimov's Magical Worlds of Fantasy
- Genre: Fantasy and science fiction
- Publisher: Signet/New American Library
- Publication date: 1988
- Publication place: United States
- Media type: Print (paperback)
- Pages: 347
- ISBN: 0-451-15723-0
- Preceded by: Atlantis
- Followed by: Curses

Ghosts is an anthology of themed fantasy and science fiction short stories on the subject of ghosts edited by Isaac Asimov, Martin H. Greenberg and Charles G. Waugh as the tenth volume in their Isaac Asimov's Magical Worlds of Fantasy series. It was first published in paperback by Signet/New American Library in December 1988. The first British edition was issued in trade paperback by Robinson in October 1989.

== Summary ==
The book collects fourteen novelettes and short stories by various fantasy and science fiction authors, with an introduction by Asimov.

== Contents ==
- "Introduction: Ghosts" (Isaac Asimov)
- "Ringing the Changes" (Robert Aickman)
- "Author! Author!" (Isaac Asimov)
- "Touring" (Michael Swanwick, Gardner Dozois and Jack M. Dann)
- "The Wind in the Rose-Bush" (Mary E. Wilkins Freeman)
- "Come Dance With Me On My Pony's Grave" (Charles L. Grant)
- "The Fire When It Comes" (Parke Godwin)
- "The Toll-House" (W. W. Jacobs)
- "The Invasion of the Church of the Holy Ghost" (Russell Kirk)
- "A Terrible Vengeance" (Charlotte Riddell)
- "Elle Est Trois, (La Mort)" (Tanith Lee)
- "A Passion for History" (Stephen Minot)
- "Daemon" (C. L. Moore)
- "The Lady's Maid's Bell" (Edith Wharton)
- "The King of Thieves" (Jack Vance)
