= Lecherous Limericks =

Book of limericks by Isaac Asimov

First edition (publ. Walker and Company)

Lecherous Limericks is the first of several compilations of dirty limericks by celebrated author Isaac Asimov (1920–1992). The book contains 100 limericks. The first limerick in the collection is:

There was a sweet girl of Decatur
Who went to sea on a freighter.
She was screwed by the master
– An utter disaster –
But the crew all made up for it later.

Asimov comments in that limerick's introduction that "This one marked the beginning. I composed it on the Queen Elizabeth II when returning from a visit to Great Britain in June 1974. When I recited it, everyone laughed. Since that time I have been writing down limericks. I wasn't going to let myself forget them and lose laughs."

== Content ==
1. "Darkest before dawn"
2. "Frustration"
3. "Independence"
4. "The dangers of drink"
5. "Look, everybody!"
6. "The last straw"
7. "Cops are human, too"
8. "Retribution"
9. "Don't back out now"
10. "Conveneent in a pinch"
11. "Overdoing it"
12. "Modesty victorious"
13. "No time out"
14. "Reward of industry"
15. "Shocking!"
16. "A poor example"
17. "The classic"
18. "A good move"
19. "Ah, those sensitive fingers"
20. "How awful"
21. "Compensation"
22. "Side effect"
23. "A la freud"
24. "Don't breathe"
25. "What a shame!"
26. "Fit for his work"
27. "The cost of ignorance"
28. "The prospective widow"
29. "The stars and stripes forever"
30. "Forethought"
31. "Music lover"
32. "Too bad"
33. "Slow but sure"
34. "Valedictorian"
35. "Ouch!"
36. "Law abiding"
37. "Let's see now"
38. "Therapeutic effect"
39. "Yo heave ho"
40. "One has one's pride"
41. "Heh, heh"
42. "Ooh, la, la"
43. "Pleasant surprise"
44. "Zoological comparison"
45. "Oh, that screaming"
46. "Indecision"
47. "Huh?"
48. "Wagnerian"
49. "Either way"
50. "Hold tight!"
51. "It's only fitting"
52. "More than one way"
53. "Following orders"
54. "Unwieldy"
55. "Disillusionment"
56. "Heartbreak!"
57. "All in a night's work"
58. "Asymmetry"
59. "Reciprocity"
60. "Better than nothing"
61. "Nothing personal"
62. "Next!"
63. "All is not lost"
64. "The economic facts"
65. "Woman's prerogative"
66. "Not foiled!"
67. "Retirement!"
68. "No, it won't"
69. "Age cannot wither"
70. "Well, hardly ever"
71. "Male chauvinist pig"
72. "Too good to use"
73. "Disillusionment"
74. "Watch out behind you"
75. "Now we'll never know"
76. "Never say die"
77. "Scarcely worth it"
78. "Bravo!"
79. "Like this, please"
80. "Making beautiful music"
81. "That's the big dipper, my dear"
82. "No safety in numbers"
83. "Last laugh"
84. "Now hear this!"
85. "Insult added to injury"
86. "Each to his taste"
87. "A natural mistake"
88. "Impatience"
89. "Change of life"
90. "Naturally!"
91. "High standards"
92. "Whatever do you mean?"
93. "For a change"
94. "Nonfunctional"
95. "Too good"
96. "Faster, faster!"
97. "Truth in advertising"
98. "The good doctor"
99. "Order of increasing importance"
100. "And, finally"

== Subsequent limerick books by Asimov ==
- Asimov, Isaac (1976). More Lecherous Limericks. ISBN 978-0802705150., collection of 100 poems
- Asimov, Isaac (1977). Still More Lecherous Limericks. ISBN 978-0802771063., collection of 100 poems:
  "Keep it Up", "Ouch!", "Definition", "The Hard Way", "Hubris", "A Woman's Work", "Idiot!", "Entertainment", "Braggart", "These College Girls", "Only Reasonable", "More Than One Way", "No Hurry", "Inept", "You Did?", "About Time", "Ugly!", "Don't Be Too Sure", "What an Improvement!", "Reasons Enough", "Practical", "To Each His Own", "Reminiscences", "Waste of Time", "Demand", "One More Notch", "Cheapskate", "What Were You Saying?", "Education", "Shame!", "Up-Up-", "Down with Virtue!", "Specialized", "No Favorites", "Silver Lining", "Season's Greetings", "Afraid of the Dark", "Unfeeling", "Exchange Problems", "Not Worth the Trouble", "Next to Godliness", "Ethnic", "No Accounting For Tastes", "Screwples", "Effective", "Bravo!", "Better Than Nothint", "The Better Alternative", "To Each Her Own", "Foreplay", "Opportunist", "Economics", "Nonchalance", "Division of Labor", "Drawing the Line", "Grammar", "Unreasonable", "Self-Defeating", "The Male Dream", "Big Mouth", "Disadvantage", "Well, Give In!", "All Talk", "Consequence", "Naughty-Cal", "Stud", "Shortchanged", "Liberal Thinking", "That'll Teach Her", "Compliance", "Weakling", "Poverty", "Emily Post", "Incredible", "Compensation", "Christmas Spirit", "Russian One", "Russian Two", "Russian Three", "Strategy", "The Ayes Have It", "Plural", "Gotcha", "One Way", "It's Not What You Think", "Don't Stop", "Too Late", "Melting", "It's Only Their Duty", "Celibacy", "Don't Miss!", "Safety First", "Repetition", "Practical", "Commencement", "Worthy of Her Hire", "You Never Lose It", "Calisthenics", "Loan", "July 4, 1976"
- Asimov, Isaac (1978). Asimov's Sherlockian Limericks. ISBN 978-0892960392., collection of 60 poems:
  'A Study in Scarlet", "The Sign of the Four", "A Scandal in Bohemia", "The Red-Headed League", "A Case of Identity", "The Boscombe Valley Mystery", "The Five Orange Pips", "The Man with the Twisted Lip", "The Adventure of the Blue Carbuncle", "The Adventure of the Speckled Band", "The Adventure of the Engineer's Thumb", "The Adventure of the Noble Bachelor", "The Adventure of the Beryl Coronet", "The Adventure of the Copper Beeches", "Silver Blaze", "The Yellow Face", "The Stockbroker's Clerk", "The 'Gloria Scott'", "The Musgrave Ritual", "The Reigate Squires", "The Crooked Man", "The Resident Patient", "The Greek Interpreter", "The Naval Treaty", "The Final Problem", "The Hound of the Baskervilles", "The Adventure of the Empty House", "The Adventure of the Norwood Builder", "The Adventure of the Dancing Men", "The Adventure of the Solitary Cyclist", "The Priory School", "The Adventure of Black Peter", "The Adventure of Charles Augustus Milverton", "The Adventure of the Six Napoleons", "The Three Students", "The Golden Pince-Nez", "The Adventure of the Missing Three-Quarter", "The Adventure of the Abbey Grange", "The Adventure of the Second Stain", "The Valley of Fear", "The Adventure of Wisteria Lodge", "The Adventure of the Cardboard Box", "The Adventure of the Red Circle", "The Adventure of the Bruce-Partington Plans", "The Adventure of the Dying Detective", "The Disappearance of Lady Frances Carfax", "The Adventure of the Devil's Foot", "His Last Bow", "The Adventure of the Illustrious Client", "The Adventure of the Blanched Soldier", "The Adventure of the Mazarin Stone", "The Adventure of the Three Gables", "The Adventure of the Sussex Vampire", "The Adventure of the Three Garridebs", "The Problem of Thor Bridge", "The Creeping Man", "The Adventure of the Lion's Mane", "The Adventure of the Veiled Lodger", "The Adventure of Shoscombe Old Place", "The Adventure of the Retired Colourman"
- Limericks: Two Gross series:
  1. Asimov, Isaac; Ciardi, John (1978). Limericks: Two Gross, or Two Dozen Dirty Dozen Stanzas. ISBN 978-0393045307., collection of 299 poems
  2. Asimov, Isaac; Ciardi, John (1981). A Grossery of Limericks. ISBN 978-0393331127., collection of 288 poems
- Asimov, Isaac (1984). Isaac Asimov's Limericks for Children. ISBN 978-0898452396., collection of 48 poems
