= View from a Height =

Book by Isaac Asimov

- First edition
- Author: Isaac Asimov
- Language: English
- Series: Fantasy & Science Fiction essays
- Publisher: Doubleday
- Publication date: September 6, 1963
- Publication place: United States
- Media type: print (Hardback and Paperback)
- Preceded by: Fact and Fancy
- Followed by: Adding a Dimension

View from a Height is a collection of seventeen scientific essays by American writer and scientist Isaac Asimov. It was the second of a series of books collecting essays from The Magazine of Fantasy and Science Fiction, written between 1959 and 1962. It was first published by Doubleday & Company in 1963. The book received a review in Science Magazine. and The American Biology Teacher.

The collection includes the essay "By Jove!", the source of the Asimov misquote describing the Solar System (besides the Sun) as "Jupiter plus debris". The actual quote is "4 planets plus debris".

== Contents ==
- Part I: Biology
  - "That's About the Size of It" (October 1961)
  - "The Egg and Wee" (June 1962)
  - "That's Life!" (March 1962)
  - "Not as We Know It" (September 1961)
- Part II: Chemistry
  - "The Element of Perfection" (November 1960)
  - "The Weighting Game" (April 1962)
  - "The Evens Have It" (August 1961)
- Part III: Physics
  - "Now Hear This!" (December 1960)
  - "The Ultimate Split of the Second" (August 1959)
  - "Order! Order!" (February 1961)
  - "The Modern Demonology" (January 1962)
  - "The Height of Up" (October 1959)
- Part IV: Astronomy
  - "Hot Stuff" (July 1962)
  - "Recipe for a Planet" (July 1961)
  - "The Trojan Hearse" (December 1961)
  - "By Jove!" (May 1962)
  - "Superficially Speaking" (February 1962)
