= Fantastic Voyage II: Destination Brain =

1987 science fiction novel by Isaac Asimov

- Author: Isaac Asimov
- Language: English
- Genre: Science fiction
- Publication date: 1987
- Publication place: United States
- Media type: Print
- Pages: 385 pp
- ISBN: 9780553273274

Fantastic Voyage II: Destination Brain is a science fiction novel by American writer Isaac Asimov, published in 1987. It is about a group of scientists who shrink to microscopic size in order to enter a human brain so that they can retrieve memories from a comatose colleague.

== Conception ==
Despite the title, Fantastic Voyage II: Destination Brain is not a sequel to Fantastic Voyage. The latter is a novelization that Asimov wrote from the 1966 film of the same name. Asimov was never quite happy with the novelization because although he was able to change some of the scientific details, it was not entirely his own work. Therefore, he wrote Fantastic Voyage II as a new, separate story or reboot that shares only the central concept of miniaturized scientists entering a human body.

== Plot ==
The story takes place in the mid to late 21st century: the Cold War has ended, yet the Soviet regime remains strong and proud. Americans and Soviets enjoy peace, but without fully accepting each other's ways, and with each always struggling for technological superiority and the prestige that accompanies it.

Under conditions of absolute secrecy, the Soviets have developed a miniaturization technology that can reduce a human to the dimensions of a molecule, or smaller. However, the process requires an enormous input of energy to miniaturize even a small object for a short time. So, although miniaturization has been shown to be scientifically possible, it also appears to be economically impracticable - a hollow triumph.

One Soviet scientist, Pyotor Leonovich Shapirov, a pioneer of the miniaturization process, had spoken vaguely of a way to make it affordable. Unfortunately, he now lies in a coma, with his secrets apparently locked away forever.

But Shapirov had been acquainted with an American scientist, Albert Jonas Morrison, who has his own peculiar theories regarding the brain's processing and storage of creative thought. Shapirov had been greatly intrigued by Morrison's ideas, and it's this interest that led the Soviets to turn to Morrison for help.

After a great deal of coercion, Morrison agrees to be miniaturized along with four Soviet scientists, enter Shapirov's dying brain, and attempt to use his computer program to retrieve the thoughts contained therein.

Later, having returned safely to normal size, but without any usable information from Shapirov, Morrison has made a new, startling discovery, which may help the Americans beat the Soviets at their own game: During the mission inside Shapirov's body, Morrison discovers that his programmed computer, instead of reading Shapirov's thoughts, has actually been reading the thoughts of Morrison's shipmates. This causes Morrison to theorize that if a number of people were united telepathically using his machine, those people might form a super-human think tank that could rediscover Shapirov's theories in short order.

=== Scientific details ===
In the novel, miniaturization is achieved by reducing the value of the Planck constant within a finite field, which it claims is the only conceivable way to do it. However, in reducing the Planck constant, the Soviet miniaturization process leaves the speed of light unchanged, and this is supposedly the reason for the extreme energy requirements.

The novel suggests two ways to solve the problem. One is to capture the energy that's released during deminiaturization and convert it into an electromagnetic field. That harnessed energy, then, could presumably be used to partially power the next miniaturization. But this is only an off-the-cuff idea, and although helpful, it would not be enough to make miniaturization truly affordable.

The other idea, which is the idea that's locked away in Shapirov's brain, is to couple the Planck constant with the speed of light, so that when one is decreased, the other is increased. Shapirov claimed that that would lead to very low-cost miniaturization, but nobody else has any idea of how to accomplish it.

As for practical applications for miniaturization, in addition to all of the obvious possibilities, the novel suggests that if a ship were reduced to the proper size, it could travel at many times the ordinary speed of light. Controlling the direction of that flight would be a significant problem because, at a small enough size, the ship would simply radiate in a random direction.

== Reception ==
Kirkus Reviews said the novel "slips down easily enough but leaves no lingering impression".

Dave Langford reviewed Fantastic Voyage II: Destination Brain for White Dwarf #97, and stated that "An impeccably idealistic finale is, alas, no compensation for the loss of the old cheap thrills."
