= The Mammoth Book of Modern Science Fiction =

Science fiction anthology

The Mammoth Book of Modern Fiction: Short Novels of the 1980s
- Cover of first edition
- Editors: Isaac Asimov; Martin H. Greenberg; Charles G. Waugh
- Cover artist: Gerry Grace
- Language: English
- Series: The Mammoth Book of ... Science Fiction
- Genre: Science fiction
- Publisher: Robinson
- Publication date: 1993
- Publication place: United Kingdom
- Media type: Print (paperback)
- Pages: 534 pp.
- ISBN: 1-85487-181-1
- Preceded by: The Mammoth Book of Fantastic Science Fiction

The Mammoth Book of Modern Science Fiction: Short Novels of the 1980s is a themed anthology of science fiction short works edited by Isaac Asimov, Martin H. Greenberg, and Charles G. Waugh, the sixth and last in a series of six samplers of the field from the 1930s through the 1980s. It was first published in trade paperback by Robinson in 1993. The first American edition was issued in trade paperback by Carroll & Graf in the same year.

The book collects ten novellas and novelettes by various science fiction authors that were originally published in the 1980s.

== Contents ==
- "Slow Music" (James Tiptree Jr.)
- "Le Croix (The Cross)" (Barry N. Malzberg)
- "Scorched Supper on New Niger" (Suzy McKee Charnas)
- "The Saturn Game" (Poul Anderson)
- "Hardfought" (Greg Bear)
- "Swarmer, Skimmer" (Gregory Benford)
- "Sailing to Byzantium" (Robert Silverberg)
- "Trinity" (Nancy Kress)
- "The Blind Geometer" (Kim Stanley Robinson)
- "Surfacing" (Walter Jon Williams)
