= The Relativity of Wrong =

1988 book by Isaac Asimov

- Cover of the first edition
- Author: Isaac Asimov
- Language: English
- Publisher: Doubleday
- Publication date: 1988
- Publication place: United States
- Media type: Print (Hardback and Paperback)
- Pages: 225
- ISBN: 0-385-24473-8
- Preceded by: Far as Human Eye Could See
- Followed by: Out of the Everywhere

The Relativity of Wrong is a 1988 collection of seventeen essays on science by American writer and scientist Isaac Asimov. The book explores and contrasts the viewpoint that "all theories are proven wrong in time", arguing that there exist degrees of wrongness.

The book was the twentieth of a series of books collecting essays from The Magazine of Fantasy and Science Fiction. Like most of the essays Asimov wrote for F&SF, each one in The Relativity of Wrong begins with an autobiographical anecdote which serves to set the mood. Several of the essays form a sequence explaining the discovery and uses of isotopes.

== Title essay ==
In the title essay, Asimov argues that there exist degrees of wrongness, and being wrong in one way is not necessarily as bad as being wrong in another way. For example, if a child spells the word sugar as "pqzzf", the child is clearly incorrect. Yet, Asimov says, a child who spells the word "shuger" (or in some other phonetic way) is "less wrong" than one who writes a random sequence of letters. Furthermore, a child who writes "sucrose" or "C_{12}H_{22}O_{11}" completely disregards the "correct" spelling but shows a degree of knowledge about the real thing under study. Asimov proposes that a better test question would ask the student to spell sugar in as many ways as possible, justifying each.

Likewise, believing that the Earth is a sphere was an advancement of human knowledge from believing it to be flat, and was less wrong (but wrong nonetheless, since it is really approximately an oblate spheroid). As Asimov puts it in the book:

When people thought the Earth was flat, they were wrong. When people thought the Earth was spherical, they were wrong. But if you think that thinking the Earth is spherical is just as wrong as thinking the Earth is flat, then your view is wronger than both of them put together.

Asimov wrote "The Relativity of Wrong" in response to an "English Literature major" who criticized him for believing in scientific progress. This unnamed individual is portrayed by Asimov as having taken the postmodern viewpoint that all scientific explanations of the world are equally in error. Irritated, the rationalist Asimov put forth his views in his monthly F&SF column, and the result became the title essay of this collection.

Asimov judges that, unlike some previous scientific theories, between relativity and quantum theory scientists have discovered the final foundations of science.

== Other essays ==
Another topic debunks the mythical lunar effect that links the human female menstrual cycle to the phases of the Moon. Some chapters focus on chemistry; one chapter discusses naturally occurring radioactive isotopes in the body, while other chapters describe the alchemical and biochemical histories of phosphorus. In a discussion on space travel, Asimov argues that interstellar travel will always be impractical, and that thus we will not visit nor be visited by alien intelligence. The book includes Asimov's conflicts with Harold Urey over Columbia's graduate chemistry program. "The Incredible Shrinking Planet" examines historically shrinking estimates of Pluto's size, leading Asimov to coin the term "mesoplanet" to describe Pluto and other bodies intermediate in size between major and minor planets. He also examines the history of the identification of Andromeda as a galaxy rather than a nebula.

== Contents ==
- "The Moon and We" (April 1986)
- "The Minor Objects" (May 1986)
- "The Second Lightest" (June 1986)
- "Labels on the Molecules" (July 1986)
- "The Consequences of Pie" (August 1986)
- "The Enemy Within" (September 1986)
- "The Relativity of Wrong" (October 1986)
- "The Unmentionable Planet" (November 1986)
- "The Dead-End Middle" (December 1986)
- "Opposite!" (January 1987)
- "Sail On! Sail On!" (February 1987)
- "The Incredible Shrinking Planet" (March 1987)
- "The Light-Bringer" (April 1987)
- "Beginning With Bone" (May 1987)
- "New Stars" (June 1987)
- "Brightening Stars" (July 1987)
- "Super-Exploding Stars" (August 1987)
