= The Mammoth Book of Classic Science Fiction =

Science fiction anthology

The Mammoth Book of Classic Science Fiction: Short Novels of the 1930s
- Cover of first edition
- Editors: Isaac Asimov; Martin H. Greenberg; Charles G. Waugh
- Cover artist: Les Edwards
- Language: English
- Series: The Mammoth Book of ... Science Fiction
- Genre: Science fiction
- Publisher: Robinson
- Publication date: 1988
- Publication place: United Kingdom
- Media type: Print (paperback)
- Pages: xiii, 572
- ISBN: 0-948164-72-7
- Followed by: The Mammoth Book of Golden Age Science Fiction

The Mammoth Book of Classic Science Fiction: Short Novels of the 1930s is a themed anthology of science fiction short works edited by Isaac Asimov, Martin H. Greenberg, and Charles G. Waugh, the first in a series of six samplers of the field from the 1930s through the 1980s. It was first published as a trade paperback by Robinson in June 1988. The first American edition was issued in trade paperback by Carroll & Graf in July of the same year. A hardcover edition was issued under the variant title Great Tales of Classic Science Fiction by Galahad Books in May 1990.

The book collects ten novellas and novelettes by various science fiction authors that were originally published in the 1930s, together with an introduction by Asimov.

== Contents ==
- "Introduction: Science Fiction Finds Its Voice" (Isaac Asimov)
- "The Shadow Out of Time" (H. P. Lovecraft)
- "A Matter of Form" (Horace L. Gold)
- "Jane Brown's Body" (Cornell Woolrich)
- "Who Goes There?" (John W. Campbell, Jr.)
- "Sidewise in Time" (Murray Leinster)
- "Alas, All Thinking!" (Harry Bates)
- "Seeker of Tomorrow" (L. T. Johnson and Eric Frank Russell)
- "Dawn of Flame" (Stanley G. Weinbaum)
- "Divide and Rule" (L. Sprague de Camp)
- "Wolves of Darkness" (Jack Williamson)
