= Our Angry Earth =

1991 non-fiction book and polemic by Isaac Asimov and Frederik Pohl

- Author: Isaac Asimov, Frederik Pohl
- Language: English
- Genre: Non-fiction
- Publisher: Tor Books
- Publication date: 1991
- ISBN: 0-312-85252-5

Our Angry Earth: A Ticking Ecological Bomb (1991) is a non-fiction book and polemic against the effects of humankind on the environment by the science fiction writers Isaac Asimov and Frederik Pohl. In his last non-fiction book, Asimov co-writes with his long-time friend science fiction author Frederik Pohl, and deals with elements of the environmental crisis such as overpopulation, oil dependence, war, global warming and the destruction of the ozone layer.

It suggests monumental disasters are threatening to destroy humankind and argues that "it is too late to save our planet from harm". The book has four sections: "The Background", "The Problems", "The Technocures" and "The Way to Go".

The coming of doom is because of deeds that do not seem evil on the face of it. Because we are concerned with the improving of the health of mankind and its security, our population has increased markedly, especially in the last hundred years, to the point where the Earth cannot support us all. Because we have industrialised ourselves in order to lift the curse of physical labour from our backs we have poured the poisons produced by the internal combustion engine into our atmosphere and dirtied it to the point where we can scarcely breathe it. Because we have learned to make new materials for the greater convenience of mankind, we have produced chemical toxins that have saturated our soil and water. Because we have found a new source of energy, and destruction, in the atomic nucleus, we face the threat of nuclear war or, even if we avoid that, the permeation of our environment with dangerous radiation and nuclear wastes.

It was first published by Tor Books in 1991, ISBN 0-312-85252-5. A 2018 edition (after both authors had died) includes a new introduction and afterword by Kim Stanley Robinson.
