= Adding a Dimension =

Book by Isaac Asimov

- First edition
- Author: Isaac Asimov
- Language: English
- Series: Science, technology, speculation
- Publisher: Doubleday
- Publication date: June 5, 1964
- Publication place: United States
- Media type: print (Hardback and Paperback)
- ISBN: 0-234-77874-1
- Preceded by: View from a Height
- Followed by: Of Time and Space and Other Things

Adding a Dimension is a collection of seventeen scientific essays by American writer and scientist Isaac Asimov. It was the third of a series of books collecting essays from The Magazine of Fantasy and Science Fiction. It was first published by Doubleday & Company in 1964.

== Contents ==
- Part I: Mathematics
  - T-Formation (August 1963)
  - One, Ten, Buckle My Shoe (December 1962)
  - Varieties of the Infinite (September 1959)
  - A Piece of Pi (May 1960)
  - Tools of the Trade (September 1960)
  - The Imaginary that Isn't (March 1961)
  - Pre-Fixing It Up (November 1962)
- Part II: Physics
  - The Rigid Vacuum (April 1963)
  - The Light that Failed (June 1963)
  - The Light Fantastic (August 1962)
- Part III: Chemistry
  - Slow Burn (October 1962)
  - You, Too, Can Speak Gaelic (March 1963)
- Part IV: Biology
  - The Lost Generation (February 1963)
  - He's Not My Type (January 1963)
- Part V: Astronomy
  - The Shape of Things (September 1962)
  - Twinkle, Twinkle, Little Star (October 1963)
- Part VI: General
  - The Isaac Winners (July 1963)
