= Exploring the Earth and the Cosmos =

Book by Isaac Asimov

- First edition
- Author: Isaac Asimov
- Genre: Non-fiction
- Publication date: 1982

Exploring the Earth and the Cosmos is a book written by Isaac Asimov in 1982.
