= Spells (anthology) =

Work of fiction

- Cover of first edition
- Editors: Isaac Asimov; Martin H. Greenberg; Charles G. Waugh
- Cover artist: Kinuko Kraft
- Language: English
- Series: Isaac Asimov's Magical Worlds of Fantasy
- Genre: Fantasy, science fiction
- Publisher: Signet/New American Library
- Publication date: 1985
- Publication place: United States
- Media type: Print (paperback)
- Pages: 350
- ISBN: 0-451-13578-4
- Preceded by: Cosmic Knights
- Followed by: Giants

Spells is an anthology of themed fantasy and science fiction short stories on the subject of spells edited by Isaac Asimov, Martin H. Greenberg and Charles G. Waugh as the fourth volume in their Isaac Asimov's Magical Worlds of Fantasy series. It was first published in paperback by Signet/New American Library in May 1985. The first British edition was issued in trade paperback by Robinson in 1988.

== Summary ==
The book collects twelve novellas, novelettes and short stories by various fantasy and science fiction authors, with an introduction by Asimov.

== Contents ==
- "Curses!" (introduction) (Isaac Asimov)
- "The Candidate" (Henry Slesar)
- "The Christmas Shadrach" (Frank R. Stockton)
- "The Snow Women" (Fritz Leiber)
- "Invisible Boy" (Ray Bradbury)
- "The Hero Who Returned" (Gerald W. Page)
- "Toads of Grimmerdale" (Andre Norton)
- "A Literary Death" (Martin H. Greenberg)
- "Satan and Sam Shay" (Robert Arthur)
- "Lot No. 249" (Arthur Conan Doyle)
- "The Witch Is Dead" (Edward D. Hoch)
- "I Know What You Need" (Stephen King)
- "The Miracle Workers" (Jack Vance)

== Reception ==
The anthology was reviewed by Andy Sawyer in Paperback Inferno #75, 1988.
