= Wizards (Asimov anthology) =

1983 fantasy and sci-fi anthology book

- Cover of first edition
- Editors: Isaac Asimov; Martin H. Greenberg; Charles G. Waugh
- Cover artist: Kinuko Kraft
- Language: English
- Series: Isaac Asimov's Magical Worlds of Fantasy
- Genre: Fantasy, science fiction
- Publisher: Signet/New American Library
- Publication date: 1983
- Publication place: United States
- Media type: Print (paperback)
- Pages: 304
- ISBN: 0-451-12542-8
- Preceded by: none
- Followed by: Witches

Wizards is an anthology of themed fantasy and science fiction short stories on the subject of wizards edited by Isaac Asimov, Martin H. Greenberg and Charles G. Waugh. The first volume in their Isaac Asimov's Magical Worlds of Fantasy series, it was first published in paperback by Signet/New American Library in October 1983. It was later gathered together with Witches, the second book in the series, into the omnibus hardcover collection Isaac Asimov's Magical Worlds of Fantasy: Witches & Wizards (1985).

== Summary ==
The book collects ten novellas, novelettes and short stories by various fantasy and science fiction authors, with an introduction by Asimov.

== Contents ==
- "Introduction" (Isaac Asimov)
- "Mazirian the Magician" (Jack Vance)
- "Please Stand By" (Ron Goulart)
- "What Good Is a Glass Dagger?" (Larry Niven)
- "The Eye of Tandyla" (L. Sprague de Camp)
- "The White Horse Child" (Greg Bear)
- "Semley's Necklace" (Ursula K. Le Guin)
- "And the Monsters Walk" (John Jakes)
- "The Seeker in the Fortress" (Manly Wade Wellman)
- "The Wall Around the World" (Theodore R. Cogswell)
- "The People of the Black Circle" (Robert E. Howard)

== Reception ==
Tom Easton, briefly surveying the anthology in Analog Science Fiction/Science Fact, notes of the selections in it that "some are classics," and singles out the Howard piece as "[o]ne of his best."

The anthology was also reviewed by Lahna F. Diskin in Fantasy Review, July 1984.
