= Atlantis (anthology) =

- Cover of first edition
- Editors: Isaac Asimov; Martin H. Greenberg; Charles G. Waugh
- Cover artist: J. K. Potter
- Language: English
- Series: Isaac Asimov's Magical Worlds of Fantasy
- Genre: Fantasy and science fiction
- Publisher: Signet/New American Library
- Publication date: 1988
- Publication place: United States
- Media type: Print (paperback)
- Pages: 349
- ISBN: 0-451-15144-5
- Preceded by: Devils
- Followed by: Ghosts

Atlantis is an anthology of themed fantasy and science fiction short stories on the subject of Atlantis edited by Isaac Asimov, Martin H. Greenberg and Charles G. Waugh as the ninth volume in their Isaac Asimov's Magical Worlds of Fantasy series. It was first published in paperback by Signet/New American Library in January 1988.

== Summary ==
The book collects eleven novellas, novelettes and short stories by various fantasy and science fiction authors, with an introduction by Asimov.

== Contents ==
- "Introduction: The Lost City" (Isaac Asimov)
- "Treaty in Tartessos" (Karen Anderson)
- "The Vengeance of Ulios" (Edmond Hamilton)
- "Scar-Tissue" (Henry S. Whitehead)
- "The Double Shadow" (Clark Ashton Smith)
- "The Dweller in the Temple" (Manly Wade Wellman)
- "Gone Fishing" (J. A. Pollard)
- "The Lamp" (L. Sprague de Camp)
- "The Shadow Kingdom" (Robert E. Howard)
- "The New Atlantis" (Ursula K. Le Guin)
- "Dragon Moon" (Henry Kuttner)
- "The Brigadier in Check—and Mate" (Sterling E. Lanier)

== Reception ==
The anthology was reviewed by Don D'Ammassa (1988) in Science Fiction Chronicle #100, January 1988.
