= Curses (anthology) =

- Cover of first edition
- Editors: Isaac Asimov; Martin H. Greenberg; Charles G. Waugh
- Cover artist: J. K. Potter
- Language: English
- Series: Isaac Asimov's Magical Worlds of Fantasy
- Genre: Fantasy and science fiction
- Publisher: Signet/New American Library
- Publication date: 1989
- Publication place: United States
- Media type: Print (paperback)
- Pages: 350
- ISBN: 0-451-16305-2
- Preceded by: Ghosts
- Followed by: Faeries

Curses is an anthology of themed fantasy and science fiction short stories on the subject of curses edited by Isaac Asimov, Martin H. Greenberg and Charles G. Waugh as the eleventh volume in their Isaac Asimov's Magical Worlds of Fantasy series. It was first published in paperback by Signet/New American Library in September 1989.

== Summary ==
The book collects seventeen novellas, novelettes and short stories by various fantasy and science fiction authors, with an introduction by Asimov.

== Contents ==
- "Introduction: Malevolence" (Isaac Asimov)
- "The Curse" (Arthur C. Clarke)
- "Julia Cahill's Curse" (George Moore)
- "The Red Swimmer" (Robert Bloch)
- "The Doom of the Griffiths" (Elizabeth Gaskell)
- "You Know Willie" (Theodore R. Cogswell)
- "Trouble with Water" (Horace L. Gold)
- "Mad Monkton" (Wilkie Collins)
- "Long Chromachy of the Crows" (Seumas MacManus)
- "The Little Black Train" (Manly Wade Wellman)
- "The Curse of the Catafalques" (F. Anstey)
- "A Séance in Summer" (Mario Martin, Jr.)
- "Transformations" (Christopher Fahy)
- "In Dark New England Days" (Sarah Orne Jewett)
- "The Messenger" (Robert W. Chambers)
- "Or the Grasses Grow" (Avram Davidson)
- "The Dollar" (Morgan Robertson)
- "A Hunger in the Blood" (Talmage Powell)
