= Asimov's Chronology of the World =

1991 book by Isaac Asimov

- First edition cover
- Author: Isaac Asimov
- Language: English
- Publisher: HarperCollins
- Publication date: 1991
- Publication place: United States
- Media type: Print (hardback)
- Pages: 675 pp
- ISBN: 0-06-270036-7

Asimov's Chronology of the World is a 1991 book by Isaac Asimov, in which the author explains in chronological order important events that happened from the Big Bang until the end of World War II. Each chapter covers a certain time period. The chapter is then broken down into headings for each important empire or country of the time and describes the events that happened there during that chapter's time period.

== Writing and content ==
The book is mostly a literary and comprehensive summary on historic people, events, and their connection and influence in historical and geographical context. It includes scientific, literary and artistic milestones as well as political and military events. Unlike most history books it gives insights rather than account of facts. The length and detail vary wildly, depending on the time and location described: it is more detailed in recent times, and when dealing with the Western world.

A substantial part of the book is dedicated to prehistory. The rest of the book is mostly European centric and most accurate in this regard. The book does have a lot of historical accounts on other parts of the world, but it is not as complete in scope or detail.

== Publication data ==
- Asimov's Chronology of the World: The History of the World From the Big Bang to Modern Times, HarperCollins Publishers, 1991, ISBN 0-062-70036-7.

== Abridgement ==

An abridged version of the book appeared under the title The March of the Millennia (Walker and Company, 1991). Asimov and Frank White were credited as the authors, although the copyright was held by Asimov only, and White's name is in smaller letters on the cover. In his posthumous autobiography I. Asimov: A Memoir, Asimov says that he completed the book by himself (under the working title The Next Millennium).

The book is a history of the world from 8000 BC to the present day, millennium by millennium, with a further chapter speculating about what life is likely to be like in the year 3000 AD. This idea was suggested by editor Beth Walker in 1989.

This book has 196 pages; Asimov's Chronology of the World has 675.
