= Life and Energy =

Book by Isaac Asimov

- First edition
- Author: Isaac Asimov
- Language: English
- Genre: Non-fiction
- Publisher: Doubleday
- Publication date: 1962
- ISBN: 0-380-00942-0

Life and Energy is a 1962 book by Isaac Asimov. It is about the biological and physical world, and their contrasts and comparisons. Thus the book is divided into two sections, which is separated by further sub-sections (i.e. chapters): 1) energy; 2) body. In order to accomplish its goal, the book starts with "layman" discussions about energy and how these can be used to single out human from other living systems, or even living systems from non-living matter, what differentiates a rock from an oyster, and finishes with advanced concepts, how living systems are able to "produce" energy.

== First Chapters: Energy ==
The first chapters covers the common questions of the distinctions between living and inanimate objects.

== Following Chapters ==
Asimov then explains in a step by step manner about the physical world first through slow, but interesting chapters. He writes about the effect and major role of the evolution and advance of man by fire and heat, he tells about thermodynamics (and its laws), he recollects the thoughts of previous scientists, and their painstaking works, and finally, the quantum theory and radiation, which has revolutionised physics and technology. An explanation of electricity and basic chemistry laws and features are also included. The physical section ends here, and continues into biology. He now continues on with special chemistry, and leaves behind physics. From this, the book leads into the functions of enzymes, amino acids, cells, the body as a whole, and the process of the cells and organs to work together to become one.

== Publication ==
- Life and Energy (1962) ISBN 0-380-00942-0
