= The Secret of the Universe =

The Secret of the Universe: Revelations in Science
- First edition
- Author: Isaac Asimov
- Series: Fantasy & Science Fiction essays
- Genre: Science
- Publisher: Doubleday
- Publication date: 1991
- Publication place: United States
- Media type: print (Hardback and Paperback)
- Pages: 240
- ISBN: 0-385-41693-8
- Preceded by: Out of the Everywhere

The Secret of the Universe (1991) is a collection of seventeen scientific essays by American writer and scientist Isaac Asimov. It is the twenty-second and final of a series of books collecting essays from The Magazine of Fantasy & Science Fiction (F&SF). Asimov died in 1992.

The 22 books collect 373 of Asimov's 399 essays for the magazine.

== Contents ==
- "The Cosmic Lens" (February 1989)
- "The Secret of the Universe" (March 1989)
- "The Moon's Twin" (April 1989)
- "The Changing Distance" (May 1989)
- "A Change of Air" (June 1989)
- "The Importance of Pitch" (July 1989)
- "Long Ago and Far Away" (August 1989)
- "The True Rulers" (September 1989)
- "The Nearest Star" (October 1989)
- "Massing the Sun" (November 1989)
- "What Are Little Stars Made Of?" (December 1989)
- "Hot, Cold, and Con Fusion" (January 1990)
- "Business as Usual" (February 1990)
- "Smashing the Sky" (March 1990)
- "Worlds in Order" (April 1990)
- "Just Say 'No'?" (May 1990)
- "The Salt-Producers" (June 1990)
