= Asimov's Biographical Encyclopedia of Science and Technology =

1964 book by Isaac Asimov

- First edition cover
- Author: Isaac Asimov
- Language: English
- Genre: Non-fiction, encyclopedia, biographical, reference
- Publisher: Doubleday
- Publication date: 1964
- Publication place: United States
- Media type: 1129
- Pages: 662
- ISBN: 0-385-04693-6 (New Revised edition)
- OCLC: 523479

Asimov's Biographical Encyclopedia of Science and Technology is a history of science by Isaac Asimov, written as the biographies of initially 1000 scientists and later with over 1500 entries. Organized chronologically, beginning with Imhotep (entry "[1]") and concluding with Stephen Hawking (entry "[1510]"), each biographical entry is numbered, allowing for easy cross-referencing of one scientist with another. Nearly every biographical sketch contains links to other biographies. For example, the article about John Franklin Enders [1195] has the sentence "Alexander Fleming's [1077] penicillin was available thanks to the work of Howard Florey [1213] and Ernst Boris Chain [1306] ..." This allows one to quickly refer to the articles about Fleming, Florey, and Chain. It includes scientists in all fields including biologists, chemists, astronomers, physicists, mathematicians, geologist, and explorers. The alphabetical list of biographical entries starts with ABBE, Cleveland [738] and ends with ZWORYKIN, Vladimir Kosma [1134].

In the Second Revised Edition, Isaac Newton receives the greatest coverage, a biography of seven pages. Galileo, Michael Faraday and Albert Einstein tie, with five pages each, and Lavoisier and Charles Darwin get four pages each. Dutch writer Gerrit Krol said about the book, "One of the charms of this encyclopedia is that to each name he adds those with whom this scientist has been in contact." The book has been revised several times, by both Asimov himself, and most recently, by his daughter Robyn Asimov.
