= Good Taste =

Short story by Isaac Asimov

First edition - Cover art by Brent Garrett

"Good Taste" is a science fiction short story by American writer Isaac Asimov. It first appeared in a limited edition book of the same name by Apocalypse Press in 1976. It subsequently appeared in Asimov's Science Fiction (Fall 1977) and in the 1983 collection The Winds of Change and Other Stories.

== Plot summary ==
Chawker Minor returns from his 'Grand Tour', including a visit to Earth, to his home on Gammer, one of several artificial satellites orbiting the Moon. The introverted society of Gammer specialises in artificial computer-designed food flavourings much in demand on Earth, to the point of shunning "natural" food grown in "dirt", and Chawker is inspired to enter the annual competition for flavouring, using something new and radical.

Despite the disapproval of his parents and elder brother, Chawker Minor does design a new flavouring that wins the competition. Asked by the Grand Master, who can taste and analyse flavourings to the smallest detail, to explain his successful and intriguing entry, he reveals that he has not used artificial computer-designed molecules, but an actual raw ingredient, garlic, maintaining that no assemblage of molecules may duplicate the complexity of a living organism.

The Grand Master, and all Gammer society, are revolted by this breach of good taste. Chawker Minor is disavowed by all and exiled from his home.

== Relationship to other works ==
This story has links to three of Asimov's works and ties together with the history of the Spacers. The Orbital Habitat, Gammer (a corruption of the Greek letter Gamma), is one of "51 Colonies" making up an O'Neill Halo in Earth Space. More of the society of the colonies is explored in "The Nations in Space."

The 51 Colonies are imagined to be independent but united, a space-borne analogy of the United States of America. Not only this, but the emergent Spacers on the colonies are engaging in technology and lifestyle changes that mark them afterwards – dependency on Robots, use of Micro-foods, and an enhanced immune system.

The colonies later engage in interstellar exploration, and retain an antipathy for Earth and its ways; this is explored in Nemesis and the Robot series.

The mastery of microfoods, explored in this story, becomes the mainstay of the survivors of the Spacers, when they settle in Mycogen on Trantor (Prelude to Foundation).
