= Asimov's Guide to the Bible =

Book by Isaac Asimov

- First combined edition (publ. Wings)
- Author: Isaac Asimov

Asimov's Guide to the Bible is a work by Isaac Asimov that was first published in two volumes in 1968 and 1969, covering the Old Testament and the New Testament (including the Catholic Old Testament, or deuterocanonical, books (see Catholic Bible) and the Eastern Orthodox Old Testament books, or anagignoskomena, along with the Fourth Book of Ezra), respectively. He combined them into a single 1296-page volume in 1981. They included maps by the artist Rafael Palacios.

Including numerous black-and-white maps, the guide goes through the books of the Bible in the order of the King James Version to the extent possible, explaining the historical and geographical setting of each one, and the political and historical influences that affected it, as well as biographical information about the main characters. His appendix "Guides to the Old and New Testament" includes biblical verses, footnotes, references, and subject indices.

The book was written for the layperson, without the expectation that the reader would have much knowledge about ancient history.

The Guide has been the subject of scholarly criticism. Professor Robert C. Dentan reminded readers that Asimov's book was not an academic work and he overlooked advances in contemporary biblical archeology. He stated it has "lengthy discussions of insoluble geographical problems...The result often seems to emphasize the trivial at the expense of the substantive," while also noting that "That is not to say the book is without value. There are those who will find it a useful, and fairly reliable, compendium of historical facts and curiosities."

== Publication data ==
- Asimov's Guide to the Bible: The Old and New Testaments, Wings Books (Random House), 1981, ISBN 0-517-34582-X, also Gramercy Press reprint 1988 (same ISBN)
