= Out of the Everywhere =

1990 essay collection by Isaac Asimov

- First edition
- Author: Isaac Asimov
- Language: English
- Subject: Science
- Publisher: Doubleday.
- Publication date: June 1, 1990.
- Publication place: United States
- Media type: Print (Hardback and Paperback)
- Pages: 238
- ISBN: 0-385-26201-9
- Preceded by: The Relativity of Wrong
- Followed by: The Secret of the Universe

Out of the Everywhere is a 1990 collection of seventeen scientific essays written by American writer and scientist Isaac Asimov and originally published in The Magazine of Fantasy and Science Fiction. The book's title comes from the opening lines of George Macdonald's poem "Baby":

"Where did you come from, baby dear?"
"Out of the everywhere into here."

== Contents ==
- Part I: Astronomy
  - "The Very Error of the Moon" (October 1987)
  - "Asking the Right Question" (November 1987)
  - "Out of the Everywhere" (November 1988)
  - "Into the Here" (December 1988)
- Part II: Humanity
  - "The Road to Humanity" (December 1987)
  - "Standing Tall" (January 1988)
  - "The Longest River" (July 1988)
  - "Is Anyone Listening" (June 1988)
- Part III: Radiation
  - "The Unrecognized Danger" (February 1988)
  - "The Radiation That Wasn't" (March 1988)
- Part IV: Magnetism
  - "Iron, Cold Iron" (April 1988)
  - "From Pole to Pole" (May 1988)
- Part V: Fuel
  - "The Fire of Life" (August 1988)
  - "The Slave of the Lamp" (September 1988)
  - "The Horse Under the Hood" (October 1988)
- Part VI: Time
  - "The Unforgiving Minute" (January 1989)
- Part VII: Something Extra
  - "A Sacred Poet" (September 1987)
