= The Mammoth Book of New World Science Fiction =

The Mammoth Book of New World Science Fiction: Short Novels of the 1960s
- Cover of first edition
- Editors: Isaac Asimov; Martin H. Greenberg; Charles G. Waugh
- Cover artist: Mike Masters
- Language: English
- Series: The Mammoth Book of ... Science Fiction
- Genre: Science fiction
- Publisher: Robinson (UK); Carroll & Graf (US)
- Publication date: 1991
- Publication place: United Kingdom
- Media type: Print (paperback)
- Pages: 506
- ISBN: 1-85487-084-X
- Preceded by: The Mammoth Book of Vintage Science Fiction
- Followed by: The Mammoth Book of Fantastic Science Fiction

The Mammoth Book of New World Science Fiction: Short Novels of the 1960s is a themed anthology of science fiction short works edited by Isaac Asimov, Martin H. Greenberg, and Charles G. Waugh, the fourth in a series of six samplers of the field from the 1930s through the 1980s. It was first published in trade paperback by Robinson in 1991. The first American edition was issued in trade paperback by Carroll & Graf in the same year. A later edition, also in trade paperback, was published by The Book Company under the variant title The Giant Book of New World SF: Short Novels of the 1960s in 1997.

The book collects ten novellas by various science fiction authors that were originally published in the 1960s.

== Contents ==
- "The Eve of RUMOKO" (Roger Zelazny)
- "The Night of the Trolls" (Keith Laumer)
- "Mercenary" (Mack Reynolds)
- "Soldier, Ask Not" (Gordon R. Dickson)
- "Weyr Search" (Anne McCaffrey)
- "Code Three" (Rick Raphael)
- "How It Was When the Past Went Away" (Robert Silverberg)
- "The Highest Treason" (Randall Garrett)
- "Hawk Among the Sparrows" (Dean McLaughlin)
- "The Suicide Express" (Philip José Farmer)
