= Witches (anthology) =

- Cover of first edition
- Editors: Isaac Asimov; Martin H. Greenberg; Charles G. Waugh
- Cover artist: Kinuko Kraft
- Language: English
- Series: Isaac Asimov's Magical Worlds of Fantasy
- Genre: Fantasy, science fiction
- Publisher: Signet/New American Library
- Publication date: 1984
- Publication place: United States
- Media type: Print (paperback)
- Pages: 350
- ISBN: 0-451-12882-6
- Preceded by: Wizards
- Followed by: Cosmic Knights

Witches is an anthology of themed fantasy and science fiction short stories on the subject of witches edited by Isaac Asimov, Martin H. Greenberg and Charles G. Waugh as the second volume in their Isaac Asimov's Magical Worlds of Fantasy series. It was first published in paperback by Signet/New American Library in April 1984. It was later gathered together with Wizards, the first book in the series, into the omnibus hardcover collection Isaac Asimov's Magical Worlds of Fantasy: Witches & Wizards (1985).

== Summary ==
The book collects fourteen novellas, novelettes and short stories by various fantasy and science fiction authors, with an introduction by Asimov.

== Contents ==
- "Introduction" (Isaac Asimov)
- "My Mother Was a Witch" (William Tenn)
- "A Message from Charity" (William M. Lee)
- "The Witch" (A. E. van Vogt)
- "The Witches of Karres" (James H. Schmitz)
- "Spree" (Barry N. Malzberg)
- "Devil's Henchman" (Murray Leinster)
- "Malice in Wonderland" (Rufus King)
- "Operation Salamander" (Poul Anderson)
- "Wizard's World" (Andre Norton)
- "Sweets to the Sweet" (Robert Bloch)
- "Poor Little Saturday" (Madeleine L'Engle)
- "Squeakie's First Case" (Margaret Manners)
- "The Ipswich Phial" (Randall Garrett)
- "Black Heart and White Heart" (H. Rider Haggard)

== Reception ==
Robert Coulson in Amazing Stories calls the book a "thick collection ... including several novelets and short novels," in which the "classics are here, of course." After going over the contents in some detail, he concludes "[o]verall it's an excellent anthology despite a couple of stories that don't belong in it, and worthwhile to anyone who hasn't already read the more often reprinted stories."

The anthology was also reviewed by and by E. F. Bleiler in Fantasy Review, November 1984.
