= Fact and Fancy =

Book by Isaac Asimov

- First edition
- Author: Isaac Asimov
- Language: English
- Series: Fantasy & Science Fiction essays
- Publisher: Doubleday
- Publication date: March 1962
- Publication place: United States
- Media type: print (Hardback and Paperback)
- Followed by: View from a Height

Fact and Fancy is a collection of seventeen scientific essays by American writer and scientist Isaac Asimov. It was the first in a series of books collecting his essays from The Magazine of Fantasy and Science Fiction, and Asimov's second book of science essays altogether (after Only a Trillion). Doubleday & Company first published it in March 1962. It was also published in paperback by Pyramid Books as part of The Worlds of Science series.

After he had written 200 essays for Fantasy and Science Fiction (out of 399 in the end), Asimov wrote of them "To this day I get more pleasure out of them than out of any other writing assignment I get."

The only essay that did not appear in Fantasy and Science Fiction was "Our Lonely Planet", which first appeared in Astounding Science Fiction.

== Contents ==
- Part I: The Earth and Away
  - "Life's Bottleneck" (April 1959)
  - "No More Ice Ages?" (January 1959)
  - "Thin Air" (December 1959)
  - "Catching Up with Newton" (December 1958)
  - "Of Capture and Escape" (May 1959)
- Part II: The Solar System
  - "Catskills in the Sky" (August 1960)
  - "Beyond Pluto" (July 1960)
  - "Steppingstones to the Stars" (October 1960)
  - "The Planet of the Double Sun" (June 1959)
- Part III: The Universe
  - "Heaven on Earth" (May 1961)
  - "Our Lonely Planet" (November 1958)
  - "The Flickering Yardstick" (March 1960)
  - "The Sight of Home" (February 1960)
  - "Here It Comes; There It Goes" (January 1961)
- Part IV: The Human Mind
  - "Those Crazy Ideas" (January 1960)
  - "My Built-in Doubter" (April 1961)
  - "Battle of the Eggheads" (July 1959)
