= Isaac Asimov's Guide to Earth and Space =

Book by Isaac Asimov

First edition (published by Random House). Cover art by Henrik Drescher.

Guide to Earth and Space (ISBN 0-449-22059-1) is a non-fiction work by American writer Isaac Asimov and published by Random House in 1991. The book differs somewhat in structure from typical literature by presenting its information in the form of answers to a series of questions, presumably posed by the reader. Like many of Asimov's non-fiction pieces, this "Guide" starts with the basics, answering relatively simple (to the modern reader) questions about the Earth - is it flat, does it spin, is it the center of the universe, etc...

From there, the questions progress roughly through the evolution of astronomy and discovery to introduce more complex topics, from the orbits of the planets to the formation of stars and the characteristics of quasars and black holes.

Many of the concepts discussed in the latter sections of the books can be compared with those presented in Asimov's 1966 work The Universe: From Flat Earth to Quasar; furthermore, they serve in several cases to update the state of the art from the intervening 25 years between publications.
