= Cosmic Knights =

Anthology of fantasy and science fiction short stories

- Cover of first edition
- Editors: Isaac Asimov; Martin H. Greenberg; Charles G. Waugh
- Cover artist: Kinuko Kraft
- Language: English
- Series: Isaac Asimov's Magical Worlds of Fantasy
- Genre: Fantasy and science fiction
- Publisher: Signet/New American Library
- Publication date: 1985
- Publication place: United States
- Media type: Print (paperback)
- Pages: 339
- ISBN: 0-451-13342-0
- Preceded by: Witches
- Followed by: Spells

Cosmic Knights is an anthology of themed fantasy and science fiction short stories on the subject of knights edited by Isaac Asimov, Martin H. Greenberg and Charles G. Waugh. The third volume in their Isaac Asimov's Magical Worlds of Fantasy series, it was first published in paperback by Signet/New American Library in January 1985. The first British edition was issued in trade paperback by Robinson in July 1987.

== Summary ==
The book collects ten novellas, novelettes and short stories by various fantasy and science fiction authors, with an introduction by Asimov.

== Contents ==
- "Introduction: In Days of Old" (Isaac Asimov)
- "Crusader Damosel" (Vera Chapman)
- "Divers Hands" (Darrell Schweitzer)
- "The Reluctant Dragon" (Kenneth Grahame)
- "The Immortal Game" (Poul Anderson)
- "The Stainless-Steel Knight" (John T. Phillifent)
- "Diplomat-at-Arms" (Keith Laumer)
- "Dream Damsel" (Evan Hunter)
- "The Last Defender of Camelot" (Roger Zelazny)
- "A Knyght Ther Was" (Robert F. Young)
- "Divide and Rule" (L. Sprague de Camp)

== Reception ==
The anthology was reviewed by Jon Wallace in Vector 140, 1987, and by Andy Sawyer in Paperback Inferno #68, 1987.
