= Mythical Beasties =

- Cover of first edition
- Editors: Isaac Asimov; Martin H. Greenberg; Charles G. Waugh
- Cover artist: Kinuko Y. Craft
- Language: English
- Series: Isaac Asimov's Magical Worlds of Fantasy
- Genre: Fantasy and science fiction
- Publisher: Signet/New American Library
- Publication date: 1986
- Publication place: United States
- Media type: Print (paperback)
- Pages: 343
- ISBN: 0-451-14267-5
- Preceded by: Giants
- Followed by: Magical Wishes

Mythical Beasties is an anthology of themed fantasy and science fiction short stories on the subject of legendary creatures edited by Isaac Asimov, Martin H. Greenberg and Charles G. Waugh as the sixth volume in their Isaac Asimov's Magical Worlds of Fantasy series. It was first published in paperback by Signet/New American Library in May 1986. The first British edition was issued under the alternate title Mythic Beasts in trade paperback by Robinson in 1988.

== Summary ==
The book collects thirteen novellas, novelettes and short stories by various fantasy and science fiction authors.

== Contents ==
- "Centaur Fielder for the Yankees" (Edward D. Hoch)
- "The Ice Dragon" (George R. R. Martin)
- "Prince Prigio" (Andrew Lang)
- "The Gorgon" (Tanith Lee)
- "The Griffin and the Minor Canon" (Frank R. Stockton)
- "The Kragen" (Jack Vance)
- "The Little Mermaid" (Hans Christian Andersen)
- "Letters from Laura" (Mildred Clingerman)
- "The Triumph of Pegasus" (Frank A. Javor)
- "Caution! Inflammable!" (Thomas N. Scortia)
- "The Pyramid Project" (Robert F. Young)
- "The Silken-Swift" (Theodore Sturgeon)
- "Mood Wendigo" (Thomas A. Easton)

== Reception ==
Tom Easton in Analog Science Fiction/Science Fact calls the book not as cute an anthology as you might think," surveying the contents to demonstrate. He notes that the Hoch piece is "guaranteed to evoke at least a smile," the Martin "a warm tale of maturation and thawing," the Lang as "epitomiz[ing] the didactic fairy tale, and the Lee as "giv[ing] us [a gorgon] who is not quite what she seems." The minotaur is featured in the Clingerman, whose protagonist is "a petulant time-traveler," while the Javor "discusses the limits of genetic engineering," and the Young "gives us an alien sphinkx with ulterior motives." He calls the Sturgeon story "fine," and "surely among his best." He also mentions his own contribution, of which he states "I don't believe the editors included it just to be sure I would review the book." The remaining stories are simply name-checked, except for Scortia's, which Easton somehow overlooks.

The anthology was also reviewed by Don D'Ammassa in Science Fiction Chronicle #91, April 1987, Terry Broome in Vector 146, 1988, and Helen McNabb in Paperback Inferno #75, 1988.
