= Faeries (anthology) =

1991 short story anthology

- Cover of first edition
- Editors: Isaac Asimov; Martin H. Greenberg; Charles G. Waugh
- Cover artist: J. K. Potter
- Language: English
- Series: Isaac Asimov's Magical Worlds of Fantasy
- Genre: Fantasy and science fiction
- Publisher: Roc Books
- Publication date: 1991
- Publication place: United States
- Media type: Print (paperback)
- Pages: 374
- ISBN: 0-451-45061-2
- Preceded by: Curses

Faeries is an anthology of themed fantasy and science fiction short stories on the subject of fairies edited by Isaac Asimov, Martin H. Greenberg and Charles G. Waugh as the twelfth and last volume in their Isaac Asimov's Magical Worlds of Fantasy series. It was first published in paperback by Roc/New American Library in 1991. It was reprinted in trade paperback by Barnes & Noble Books in 2000. The book has also been translated into Italian.

== Summary ==
The book collects eighteen novellas, novelettes and short stories by various fantasy and science fiction authors, with an introduction by Asimov.

== Contents ==
- "Fairyland" (Isaac Asimov)
- "How the Fairies Came to Ireland" (Herminie Templeton)
- "The Manor of Roses" (Thomas Burnett Swann)
- "The Fairy Prince" (H. C. Bailey)
- "The Ugly Unicorn" (Jessica Amanda Salmonson)
- "The Brownie of the Black Haggs" (James Hogg)
- "The Dream of Akinosuké" (Lafcadio Hearn)
- "Elfinland" (Johann Ludwig Tieck)
- "Darby O'Gill and the Good People" (Herminie Templeton)
- "No-Man's-Land" (John Buchan)
- "The Prism" (Mary E. Wilkins)
- "The Kith of the Elf-Folk" (Lord Dunsany)
- "The Secret Place" (Richard M. McKenna)
- "The King of the Elves" (Philip K. Dick)
- "Flying Pan" (Robert F. Young)
- "My Father, the Cat" (Henry Slesar)
- "Kid Stuff" (Isaac Asimov)
- "The Long Night of Waiting" (Andre Norton)
- "The Queen of Air and Darkness" (Poul Anderson)
