= Magical Wishes =

Themed fantasy and science fiction anthology

- Cover of first edition
- Editors: Isaac Asimov; Martin H. Greenberg; Charles G. Waugh
- Cover artist: Kinuko Kraft
- Language: English
- Series: Isaac Asimov's Magical Worlds of Fantasy
- Genre: Fantasy and science fiction
- Publisher: Signet/New American Library
- Publication date: 1986
- Publication place: United States
- Media type: Print (paperback)
- Pages: 350
- ISBN: 0-451-14575-5
- Preceded by: Mythical Beasties
- Followed by: Devils

Magical Wishes is an anthology of themed fantasy and science fiction short stories on the subject of wishes edited by Isaac Asimov, Martin H. Greenberg and Charles G. Waugh as the seventh volume in their Isaac Asimov's Magical Worlds of Fantasy series. It was first published in paperback by Signet/New American Library in November 1986. The first British edition was issued in trade paperback by Robinson in July 1987.

== Summary ==
The book collects sixteen novellas, novelettes and short stories by various fantasy and science fiction authors, with an introduction by Asimov.

== Contents ==
- "Introduction: Wishing Will Make It So" (Isaac Asimov)
- "The Monkey's Paw" (W. W. Jacobs)
- "Behind the News" (Jack Finney)
- "The Flight of the Umbrella" (Marvin Kaye)
- "Tween" (J. F. Bone)
- "The Boy Who Brought Love" (Edward D. Hoch)
- "The Vacation" (Ray Bradbury)
- "The Anything Box" (Zenna Henderson)
- "A Born Charmer" (Edward P. Hughes)
- "What If ..." (Isaac Asimov)
- "Millennium" (Fredric Brown)
- "Dreams Are Sacred" (Peter Phillips)
- "The Same to You Doubled" (Robert Sheckley)
- "Gifts" (Gordon R. Dickson)
- "I Wish I May, I Wish I Might" (Bill Pronzini)
- "Three Day Magic" (Charlotte Armstrong)
- "The Bottle Imp" (Robert Louis Stevenson)

== Reception ==
The anthology was reviewed by Michael E. Stamm (1987) in Fantasy Review, January-February 1987, and by Don D'Ammassa in Science Fiction Chronicle #96, September 1987.
