= Martin H. Greenberg =

American academic, anthologist (1941–2011)

- Born: Martin Harry Greenberg; March 1, 1941; South Beach, Florida, U.S.
- Died: June 25, 2011 (aged 70); Green Bay, Wisconsin, U.S.
- Education: Ph.D., Political science, 1969
- Occupations: University professor; editor; writer
- Writing career
- Period: 1974–2011 (as anthologist)
- Genre: Speculative fiction anthologies
- Subjects: Urban and regional science; Middle East affairs, terrorism

Martin Harry Greenberg (March 1, 1941 – June 25, 2011) was an American academic and anthologist in many genres, including mysteries and horror, but especially in speculative fiction. In all, he compiled 1,298 anthologies and commissioned over 8,200 original short stories. He founded Tekno Books, a packager of more than 2000 published books. He was also a co-founder of the Sci-Fi Channel. Greenberg was also an expert in terrorism and the Middle East. He was a longtime friend, colleague and business partner of Isaac Asimov.

== Biography ==
Greenberg was born to Max and Mae Greenberg in South Miami Beach, Florida. He received a bachelor's degree from the University of Miami, a doctorate in political science from the University of Connecticut in 1969, and taught at the University of Wisconsin–Green Bay from 1975 until 1996. Early in his career he was sometimes confused with Martin Greenberg, publisher of Gnome Press; they were not related. Isaac Asimov suggested that he call himself "Martin H. Greenberg" or "Martin Harry Greenberg" to distinguish him from the other Martin Greenberg "if he expected to deal fruitfully with the science-fiction world".

Greenberg's first anthology (and first speculative fiction publication) was Political Science Fiction: An Introductory Reader (Prentice Hall, 1974), edited with Patricia S. Warrick and intended for use as a teaching guide. Warrick was a colleague at one of the UW two-year colleges, University of Wisconsin–Fox Valley, who recruited Greenberg to give one lecture on the future of politics. He learned that her course used one science fiction text; she learned of his interest and made a "career-changing comment". Ten educational anthologies under the series name Through Science Fiction followed through 1978, mainly from Rand McNally. (Note: Following the Political Science Fiction reader Greenberg created ten Through Science Fiction anthologies. Two published by St. Martin's Press in 1974 were collaborations with Warrick and another editor: Anthropology Through Science Fiction with Carol Mason and Introductory Psychology Through Science Fiction with Harvey A. Katz. Six titles published by Rand McNally College Publishing Co from 1974 to 1976 were edited by Greenberg, Olander, Warrick, and another colleague: Sociology —; School and Society —; American Government —; Social Problems —; Run to Starlight, Sports —; and Marriage and the Family Through Science Fiction. Greenberg and Olander alone produced Criminal Justice — and International Relations— (McNally, 1977, 1978). ISFDB does not catalog this as a book series and for Greenberg catalogs the ten prefaces and introductions as "Essays".) In the late 1970s Greenberg began partnering with Joseph D. Olander on more conventional science fiction anthologies. They also created the critical series Writers of the 21st Century (Taplinger, 1977 to 1983) and produced six of its seven volumes, each titled for its featured author. (Note: Greenberg and Olander collected critical essays on Clarke, Asimov, Heinlein, Le Guin, Bradbury, and Dick. Tim Underwood and Chuck Miller covered Vance in #6.)

Greenberg typically teamed up with another editor, splitting the duties of story selection, editing, copyright searches, and handling royalties to authors. Major partners include Isaac Asimov (127 anthologies, most notably The Great SF Stories series), Charles G. Waugh (193 anthologies), Jane Yolen, and Robert Silverberg. He and Mark Tier shared two Prometheus Special Awards in 2005 for jointly creating the anthologies Give Me Liberty and Visions of Liberty (Baen Books, 2004). He also shared one Bram Stoker Award from the horror writers for the 1998 anthology Horrors! 365 Scary Stories.

The Horror Writers Association gave Greenberg its highest honor in 2003, the Bram Stoker Award for Lifetime Achievement recognizing superior work that "substantially influenced the horror genre". He also received the Ellery Queen Award, which honors "outstanding people in the mystery-publishing industry", from the Mystery Writers of America in 1995 and one of three inaugural Solstice Awards in 2009, from the Science Fiction and Fantasy Writers of America for his lifetime contributions to their field. He is the only person to be awarded Lifetime Achievement Awards from all three of these groups.

Greenberg died in Green Bay, Wisconsin, on June 25, 2011, from complications of cancer. He was survived by two stepdaughters from his first wife, by his second wife, and by their daughter. He is buried at the Cnesses Israel Hebrew Cemetery in Green Bay.

== Selected anthologies edited ==
- Political Science Fiction (1974), eds. Greenberg and Patricia S. Warrick
- Through Science Fiction (1974 to 1978), series of ten guides for teachers edited by Greenberg and collaborators
- Dawn of Time (1979)
- The Science Fictional Solar System (1979)
- Space Mail (1980)
- Science Fiction A to Z (1982)
- Space Mail, Volume II (1982)
- TV: 2000 (1982)
- The Fantasy Hall of Fame (1983, with Robert Silverberg)
- Intergalactic Empires (1983)
- Wizards (1983)
- The Science Fictional Olympics (1984)
- Young Extraterrestrials (1984)
- Supermen (1984)
- Witches (1984)
- Amazing Stories: 60 Years of the Best Science Fiction (1985, with Isaac Asimov)
- Cosmic Knights (1985)
- Giants (1985)
- Spells (1985)
- Alternative Histories (1986, with Charles G. Waugh)
- Comets (1986)
- Magical Wishes (1986)
- Mythical Beasties (1986)
- Tin Stars (1986)
- Devils (1987)
- Neanderthals (1987)
- Robert Adams' Book of Alternate Worlds (1987)
- Space Shuttles (1987)
- Atlantis (1988)
- Ghosts (1988)
- The Mammoth Book of Classic Science Fiction (1988)
- Monsters (1988)
- Werewolves (1988, with Jane Yolen)
- The Best Japanese Science Fiction Stories (1989, with John L. Apostolou)
- Curses (1989)
- Foundation's Friends (1989)
- The Further Adventures of Batman (1989)
- The Mammoth Book of Golden Age Science Fiction (1989)
- Robots (1989)
- Catfantastic: Nine Lives and Fifteen Tales (1989, with Andre Norton)
- Dick Tracy: The Secret Files (1990, with Max Allan Collins)
- The Further Adventures of The Joker (1990)
- Invasions (1990)
- The Mammoth Book of Vintage Science Fiction (1990)
- Alternate Wars (1991)
- Faeries (1991)
- The Mammoth Book of New World Science Fiction (1991)
- Nightmares on Elm Street: Freddy Krueger's Seven Sweetest Dreams (1991)
- Catfantastic II (1991, with Andre Norton)
- Alternate Americas (1992)
- The Further Adventures of Batman Volume 2 Featuring the Penguin (1992)
- The Mammoth Book of Fantastic Science Fiction (1992)
- Xanadu (1992, with Jane Yolen)
- The Further Adventures of Batman Volume 3 Featuring Catwoman (1993)
- The Further Adventures of Wonder Woman (1993)
- The Further Adventures of Superman (1993)
- The Mammoth Book of Modern Science Fiction (1993)
- Predators (1993, with Ed Gorman)
- Xanadu 2 (1993, with Jane Yolen)
- Xanadu 3 (1994, with Jane Yolen)
- Catfantastic III (1994, with Andre Norton)
- Celebrity Vampires (1995)
- Dark Love (1995)
- Vampire Detectives (1995)
- Dinosaurs (1996)
- UFOs: The Greatest Stories (1996)
- Catfantastic IV (1996, with Andre Norton)
- Adventures of the Batman (1997)
- Legends of the Batman (1997)
- Robert Bloch's Psychos (1997)
- Tales of the Batman (1997)
- Holmes for the Holidays (1998, with Jon L. Lellenberg and Carol-Lynn Waugh)
- Mob Magic (1998, with Brian M. Thomsen)
- Alternate Generals (1998, with Harry Turtledove and Roland J. Green)
- Catfantastic V (1999, with Andre Norton)
- My Favorite Fantasy Story (2000)
- Murder Most Feline (2001)
- Past Imperfect (2001)
- Robert Silverberg Presents the Great SF Stories: 1964 (with Robert Silverberg) (2001)
- Once Upon a Galaxy (2002)
- Further Adventures of Xena: Warrior Princess (2003)
- The Repentant (2003, with Brian M. Thomsen)
- Sirius: The Dog Star (2004)
- The Best Time Travel Stories of the 20th Century (2005)
- Heroes in Training (2007)
- Full Moon City (Pocket Books, 2010, with Darrell Schweitzer)
- Steampunk'd (DAW Books, 2010, with Jean Rabe)
- Courts of the Fey (DAW Books, November 2011, with Russell Davis)
- Human for a Day (DAW Books, 2011, with Jennifer Brozek)
- Westward Weird (DAW Books, 2012, with Kerrie Hughes)
