= Jack Doheny =

Jack Doheny may refer to:

- A character in Powder Blue (film)
- A character in The Death Dealers
