= Visions of the Universe =

1981 book by Isaac Asimov

- First edition
- Editor: Carl Sagan
- Author: Isaac Asimov
- Illustrator: Kazuaki Iwasaki
- Publication date: 1981
- ISBN: 978-0939540013

Visions of the Universe (ISBN 978-0939540013) is a book written by Isaac Asimov and illustrated by Kazuaki Iwasaki in 1981. It was edited by Carl Sagan. Following the success of his best-selling book Cosmos, Sagan set up his own publishing firm, Cosmos Store, in order to publish science books for the general public. Visions of the Universe was one of the books this short-lived firm published.
