= Spell My Name with an S =

Science-fiction short story by Isaac Asimov

- Short story by Isaac Asimov
- Country: United States
- Language: English
- Genre: Science fiction

Publication
- Published in: Star Science Fiction
- Publication type: Periodical
- Publisher: Ballantine Magazines
- Media type: Print (Magazine, Hardback & Paperback)
- Publication date: January 1958

"Spell My Name with an S" is a science fiction short story by American writer Isaac Asimov. The story first appeared in the January 1958 (and only) issue of Star Science Fiction under the title "S as in Zebatinsky", and was reprinted in the 1959 collection Nine Tomorrows under Asimov's original title. The story was inspired by Asimov's frustration with the frequent misspelling of his name as "Azimov".

== Plot summary ==
The story concerns Marshall Zebatinsky, a Polish-American nuclear physicist. He is concerned that his career has stalled, and in desperation consults a numerologist for advice on restarting it. The numerologist advises him to change the first letter of his name to "S": Sebatinsky.

A complicated series of events ensue in which Sebatinsky is investigated by the Security establishment, who feel that he must be trying to hide something. His Polish origins lead them to suspect that he is trying to distract attention from relatives in the Eastern Bloc. They discover that he does have a distant cousin who is also a physicist, which leads to the discovery that the Soviet Union is working on gamma ray-deflecting shielding as a nuclear defense.

The Americans immediately start to develop their own counter-defense. They still have no real reason to suspect Sebatinsky, but just in case they look for a discreet way to get him out of the classified project in which he is engaged. Much to his surprise (and delight), Sebatinsky is appointed to a senior professorial post, which is exactly what he hoped for when he went to the numerologist.

At the end of the story, it is revealed that the numerologist is actually an extraterrestrial and that he was involved in a bet with another extraterrestrial as to whether he could avert a nuclear war on Earth with a minor stimulus. The story concludes with the same two beings making another bet to put everything back the way it was with another minuscule alteration, with the likely consequence that the world will end in nuclear holocaust after all.

Asimov commented that he added the last section of the story as an afterthought. Despite the original happy ending, he was not satisfied, because he had not accounted for the numerologist. So he put in the last part to explain the numerologist, giving the story a sad ending after all.

== Adaptations ==
- Spell My Name with an S (2014), short film directed by Samuel Ali
