= It's Been a Good Life =

2002 book edited by Janet Asimov

- Editor: Janet Jeppson Asimov
- Author: Isaac Asimov
- Language: English
- Genre: Biography
- Publisher: Prometheus Books
- Publication date: 2002
- ISBN: 1-57392-968-9

It's Been a Good Life (2002) is a book edited by Janet Jeppson Asimov. The book, published by Prometheus Books (ISBN 1-57392-968-9), is a collection of Isaac Asimov's diaries, personal letters, and a condensation of his three earlier autobiographies:

- In Memory Yet Green, (1979, Doubleday)
- In Joy Still Felt, (1980, Doubleday)
- I. Asimov: A Memoir, (1994, Doubleday)

Janet Jeppson Asimov's primary role was in choosing the entries and occasionally editing them so the reader would know the people of whom he was speaking. In one case, her edited version is less explicit than Isaac's original, where Isaac and "a famous man" debate anti-Semitism (chapter 23 of the book). The famous man voices opposition to scientists since some had aided the Holocaust, and Isaac replies that this is exactly the same as condemning the Jews for crucifying Jesus. The edited version omits the celebrity's name—Elie Wiesel.

In this book Janet Asimov revealed for the first time that Isaac had died of AIDS as a result of contracting the HIV virus through a blood transfusion he had received in 1983. This had been kept a secret at the time – April 1992 – because of widespread prejudice against AIDS patients.

The title "It's Been a Good Life" is a quote from the concluding page of Asimov Laughs Again (1991), one of his last works.
