= Isaac Asimov's Treasury of Humor =

1971 humor book

First edition (publ. Houghton Mifflin)

Isaac Asimov's Treasury of Humor is a humour book written by Isaac Asimov consisting of and subtitled as "A lifetime collection of favorite jokes, anecdotes, and limericks with copious notes on how to tell them and why".

Isaac Asimov wrote more than 500 books over the course of his career. While most well known for his science fiction, Asimov's bibliography spanned both mystery, poetry and non-fiction. Treasury of Humor was one of his three humor books.

Consisting of jokes ranging from puns to humorous anecdotes, the book also features explanations of what makes the jokes funny, their effect on different audiences, and personal touches one can add to them.

== Related work ==
Asimov also wrote a short story, Jokester, in which a character wonders where the jokes come from, since so many people say "I heard a good one", but never "I invented a good one". His investigation leads him to believe that jokes are of alien origin and designed to study the psychology of Earthlings.

== Publication data ==
- Treasury of Humor: A Lifetime Collection of Favorite Jokes, Anecdotes, and Limericks with Copious Notes on How to Tell Them and Why
  - 1971, Houghton Mifflin (hardcover), ISBN 0-395-12665-7
  - 1979, Houghton Mifflin (paperback) ISBN 0-395-28412-0
  - 1991, reprinted as Isaac Asimov's Treasury of Humor (paperback) ISBN 0-395-57226-6
- 1992, Asimov Laughs Again: More Than 700 Jokes, Limericks, and Anecdotes, Harper Paperbacks 1993 reprint (paperback) ISBN 0-06-092448-9
