= Autobiographies of Isaac Asimov =

Autobiographies of American writer Isaac Asimov

Isaac Asimov (c. 1920–1992) wrote three volumes of autobiography. In Memory Yet Green (1979) and In Joy Still Felt (1980) were a two-volume work, covering his life up to 1978. The third volume, I. Asimov: A Memoir (1994), published after his death, was not a sequel but a new work which covered his whole life. This third book won a Hugo Award.

Before writing these books, Asimov also published three anthologies of science fiction stories which contained autobiographical accounts of his life in the introductions to the stories: The Early Asimov (1972), Before the Golden Age (1974), and Buy Jupiter and Other Stories (1975).

== Books ==
The Early Asimov, or, Eleven Years of Trying (Doubleday, 1972) is a collection of almost all of the published short stories Asimov wrote during the first eleven years of his career, 1938 to 1949, other than his robots and Foundation series of stories (and his first story, "Marooned off Vesta"), which had already been collected in other books. Each story is prefaced by an introduction about how the story came to be written and published. The book also refers to eleven unpublished stories which, at the time the book was written, Asimov thought had since been lost, as he no longer had the manuscripts. Collectively, this material describes the beginning of Asimov's career and his long association with John W. Campbell, the editor of Astounding Science-Fiction, who published many of the stories in the book and to whom the book is dedicated. The book covers the first 60 stories Asimov wrote, and ends with the publication of his first novel in 1950.

Before the Golden Age: A Science Fiction Anthology of the 1930s (Doubleday, 1974) is a collection of science fiction short stories by a variety of authors, which were all originally published in pulp magazines in the 1930s. It also includes one of Asimov's eleven lost stories, "Big Game" (written in 1941), which a fan had discovered in a collection of Asimov's papers in Boston University library after reading about it in The Early Asimov. Edited by Asimov, this book contains autobiographical material describing his childhood as a science fiction fan who grew up reading 1930s magazines. It ends at the point when Asimov sold his first published story in 1938, where The Early Asimov began, and thus is a prequel to that book.

Buy Jupiter and Other Stories (Doubleday, 1975) collects 24 of Asimov's stories, first published between 1950 and 1973. The autobiographical material between the stories covers the same period, carrying on from where The Early Asimov left off and ending at his marriage to his second wife, Janet Jeppson Asimov. In the introduction Asimov explains that he hopes that by including autobiographical information in his story collections, it will be easier to resist editorial pressure to write a proper autobiography.

In Memory Yet Green: The Autobiography of Isaac Asimov, 1920–1954 (Doubleday, 1979) is the first volume of Asimov's two-volume autobiography. It ends shortly before the point when he became a full-time writer. Up until then, his main career had been lecturing in biochemistry at Boston University School of Medicine, although by then he already earned more from his writing than he did from his academic post. It is Asimov's joint-200th book; it was published on the same day as Opus 200. It includes another of Asimov's lost stories, "The Weapon" (written in 1938), which he had forgotten had been published under a pseudonym.

In an interview shortly after publication, Asimov said: "I've done nothing in my life. You would be surprised how shrewdly I had to write it to obscure that fact." He later wrote:

A reader once told me, enthusiastically, after the autobiography was published, that he had read the book with immense interest and that he had been unable to keep from turning the pages and reading on and on and on, laughing all the way.

I said to him, curiously, "Didn't you notice that nothing was happening?"

"I noticed that," he said, "but I didn't care."

The publishers disliked Asimov's original title, As I Remember, so they asked him to provide another, suggesting he find a good quote from an obscure poem. Asimov suggested the following poem:

In memory yet green, in joy still felt,
The scenes of life rise sharply into view.
We triumph; Life's disasters are undealt,
And while all else is old, the world is new.

Doubleday agreed to Asimov's new title, but could not find the source of the verse he had given them. When Doubleday inquired, Asimov confessed: "I wrote it myself". The poem was included at the front of the book, attributed to "Anon."

In Joy Still Felt: The Autobiography of Isaac Asimov, 1954–1978 (1980) is the second part of Asimov's autobiography. The title is also taken from the poem. The two volumes are 640,000 words long in total. In Joy Still Felt won the 1981 Locus Award for best science fiction-related nonfiction book.

Asimov had intended to write the third volume in 2000, starting where the second had left off, and to call it The Scenes of Life. But after falling ill in 1990 he decided to write it early, on his wife Janet's advice, in case he did not live that long. Janet's opinion was that the original two-volume autobiography was too chronological (although it was highly detailed, owing to Asimov's eidetic memory and the copious notes he kept about his life in his daily diary), lending it an emotionless and reserved quality. As such, she encouraged him to write a third volume which would instead convey more of his feelings about the contents. Published posthumously under the title I. Asimov: A Memoir (Doubleday, 1994; 235,000 words), it covered his whole life, so that people who had not read the first two volumes could still enjoy it. Janet Asimov wrote an epilogue.

All three books were nominated for a Hugo Award, in the category of best non-fiction book. I. Asimov: A Memoir won in 1995. I. Asimov: A Memoir also won the Locus Award for Best Non-fiction in 1995.

Janet Asimov later edited It's Been a Good Life (Prometheus Books, 2002), an abridged compilation of all three books.
