= Inside the Atom =

Book by Isaac Asimov

- 1974 edition cover
- Author: Isaac Asimov
- Language: English
- Subject: Atomic physics
- Genre: Popular science
- Published: New York City
- Publisher: Abelard-Schuman
- Publication place: United States
- Media type: Print
- Pages: 176 pp.

Inside the Atom is a popular science book by American author Isaac Asimov. The first edition of the book was published in 1956 by Abelard-Schuman. Revised editions were brought out in subsequent years.

== Overview ==
The book describes the internal structure of the atom. The sequence of concepts described in the book follows the sequence that those facts were discovered in. It describes the various sub-atomic structures within the atom, and the functions they fill in the whole structure. Later chapters describe chemical elements and isotopes, the stability and instability of atomic nuclei, and finally atomic energy, the uses it has, and the threat that it poses. A review in the educational journal The Clearing House said that the book was "lucid", and that its "analytical style exemplifies the art of good teaching." The book is aimed at educated lay-readers, and high-school science students. Inside the Atom ends on a cautionary note, stating "If only we can learn to use the knowledge we already have..."

In 1956, the book was used in a pilot program to advance science education sponsored by the American Association for the Advancement of Science. Approximately two hundred titles were circulated amongst high schools that did not have adequate science reading material.
