= Petrovichi =

Rural locality in the Smolensk Oblast, Russia

Petrovichi Петро́вичи
- Selo
- Interactive map of Petrovichi
- Location within Smolensk Oblast Location within European Russia Location within Russia
- Coordinates: 53°58′30″N 32°09′32″E
- Country: Russia
- Federal subject: Smolensk Oblast
- Founded: 1403 (Julian)
- Time zone: UTC+3 (MSK)
- Postal code: 216430
- OKTMO ID: 66656435161

Petrovichi (Russian: Петро́вичи) is a rural locality (a village) in Shumyachsky District of Smolensk Oblast, Russia, located about 400 kilometers (250 mi) southwest of Moscow, 668 kilometers (415 mi) south of St Petersburg, 100 kilometers (62 mi) south of Smolensk, and 16 kilometers (9.9 mi) east of the border between Belarus and Russia. Its population in 1998 was 215.

The village is the birthplace of Isaac Asimov. Asimov left it at the age of three, with his parents and sister, emigrating to the United States. There is a stone memorial at the site of his birth.

== History ==
The earliest recorded mention of Petrovichi is from 1403. In the Russian Empire, Petrovichi was a shtetl in Klimovichskiy Uyezd. The governorate, historically Belarusian land, was a part of the Empire's Northwestern Krai. Petrovichi's population was half Jewish, half Belarusian. It had both a church and a synagogue, each one with a school attached to it. According to Asimov's memoirs, the place had never known of pogroms. There were amicable business connections and even friendships between the two communities. Asimov even reports non-Jews paying friendly visits to the local synagogue.

Tsar Nicholas I (who ruled from 1825 to 1855) at one point ordered the expulsion of all Jewish people who resided in Great Russia, or Russia proper, outside of the Pale of Settlement. However, a rich and powerful Russian landlord, who owned much land on both sides of the border, saved the Jewish community of Petrovichi from "ethnic cleansing" by illegally moving the border marker from the west to the east of the shtetl.

During the Soviet times, restrictions were no longer imposed on the settlement of Jewish people. The village became a part of the Russian SFSR and briefly belonged to Gomel Governorate before being transferred to Smolensk Oblast. The population dwindled significantly.

In 1921, Isaac Asimov and 16 other children in Petrovichi developed double pneumonia. Only Asimov survived.

In July 1941, Petrovichi was occupied by the German armies. 416 Jewish inhabitants who did not flee in time were massacred. It was liberated by the Red Army in September 1943.
