= Extraterrestrial Civilizations =

1979 book by Isaac Asimov

- Hardcover edition
- Author: Isaac Asimov
- Language: English
- Subject: Extraterrestrial life
- Publisher: Crown
- Publication date: 1979
- Publication place: United States
- Media type: Print (Hardcover and Paperback)
- Pages: 282
- ISBN: 978-0-517-53075-7
- OCLC: 4638134
- Dewey Decimal: 574.999
- LC Class: QB54 .A84 1979

Extraterrestrial Civilizations is a 1979 book by Isaac Asimov, in which the author estimates the probability of there being intelligent extraterrestrial civilizations within the Milky Way galaxy. This estimation is approached by progressively analyzing the requirements for life to exist.

== Overview ==
The term "Earth-like world" is prominent, in that the assumption is made that any world where life could evolve would have certain similarities to Earth, such as temperature ranges and gravity sufficient for an atmosphere to exist. Asimov begins with the estimated number of stars in the galaxy, 300 billion.

This number is then reduced to 280 billion as stars without planetary systems are discarded, and then furthermore reduced as more factors are taken into consideration. This process culminates in the statement that "the number of planets in our galaxy on which a technological civilization is now in being is roughly 530,000."

== See also ==
- Drake equation
