= The Intelligent Man's Guide to Science =

1960 book by Isaac Asimov

- Side of the original edition's slip case
- Author: Isaac Asimov
- Language: English
- Subject: Natural science
- Publisher: Basic Books
- Publication date: October 1960
- Publication place: United States
- Media type: Print (Hardcover and Paperback)
- Pages: 875
- ISBN: 978-0-14-017213-3

The Intelligent Man's Guide to Science is a general guide to the sciences by the American writer and scientist Isaac Asimov. It was first published in 1960 by Basic Books. Revised versions were published as The New Intelligent Man's Guide to Science (1965), Asimov's Guide to Science (1972), and Asimov's New Guide to Science (1984).

The book received positive reviews, praising it as a well-written work on science.

== Background and publication history ==
Asimov was first contacted by Leon Svirsky of Basic Books in 1957 about the possibility of writing a book that would provide an overview of science, and the two met at Asimov's home on 13 May to discuss the details. Six days later, Asimov received a contract for the book, along with a $1500 advance. At this point in his life, it had been just over a year since Asimov had given up his teaching duties at Boston University and taken up writing full-time. He had published 11 nonfiction books, including books on chemistry, physics, astronomy, a college-level biochemistry textbook, and a collection of science essays. However, he was momentarily daunted by the prospect of writing a major book on all of science, and he delayed signing the contract until 15 July, after receiving encouragement from his friend (and future wife) Janet Jeppson.

The book's title was Svirsky's, chosen as a deliberate homage to George Bernard Shaw's The Intelligent Woman's Guide to Socialism and Capitalism (1928). Asimov feared the title would be seen as elitist and condescending, and he suggested Everyone's Guide to Science as an alternative, but Svirsky refused. Years later, when he was confronted by annoyed feminists who asked why the book was restricted to men, Asimov would claim that the "intelligent man" of the title referred to himself; thus anticipating the title Asimov's Guide to Science adopted for the third edition. Svirsky also wanted the book confined to scientific advances made in the 20th century. Asimov, however, preferred to approach each field in a historical manner, starting with the ancient Greeks or, at the very least, Galileo Galilei. As often happened when Asimov was given editorial directions he disagreed with, he ignored them, and wrote the book just as he wanted to. In organizing the various fields of science, Asimov chose to begin with the universe as a whole and work inward in narrowing circles until he was inside the brain at the end.

Asimov began work on the book on 2 October, and found that he had no trouble with it at all, writing anywhere from 6,000 to 10,000 words a day without any sense of strain. By 27 January 1958, Asimov was able to deliver the first half of the completed manuscript to Basic Books, but at a meeting a month later, Svirsky suggested cutting the book in half so it could fit in one volume. At that point, Asimov was only two chapters shy of finishing the book, but saw no reason to complete it if it would be subjected to such radical abridgment, and halted work. He resumed work after being informed on 11 March that Svirsky would not try to reduce the book by half, but would instead publish it in two volumes. Svirsky also insisted that the book include an introduction by the geneticist George Beadle. Asimov felt that his work didn't need an introduction by anyone else, and even though he found Beadle's introduction to be very elegant, he still resented its inclusion. Asimov delivered the final chapters to Basic Books on 21 April, and the appendices on 4 May.

When he began proofing the book's galleys, Asimov was horrified to find that Svirsky still cut out some 30% of the book's material. Asimov reinserted as much information into the galley proofs as he could, but he remained unhappy with the book.

The Intelligent Man's Guide to Science was first published in 1960 by Basic Books. It was published, in revised editions, as The New Intelligent Man's Guide to Science in 1965, Asimov's Guide to Science in 1972, and Asimov's New Guide to Science in 1984.

== Reception ==
The Intelligent Man's Guide to Science received positive reviews from the physicist Derek J. de Solla Price in Science and Floyd C. Gale in Galaxy Science Fiction, and a mixed review from John Pfeiffer in The New York Times.

Price considered Asimov's work a novelty in popular science writing. He credited Asimov with surveying the whole of modern science. Gale credited Asimov with writing well and making difficult concepts easy to understand. Gale considered the book well-written and credited Asimov with helping to make even difficult concepts easy to understand. Pfeiffer wrote that Asimov tried to discuss too many aspects of science in the limited space available to him and compressed material "to a point where the result is almost a listing of developments with inadequate transitions in between". He concluded that Asimov had "prepared a good introduction to modern research" that "would have been better if he had allowed himself more space for the unique, imaginative writing of which he is so obviously capable."

The Intelligent Man's Guide to Science was nominated for a National Book Award in the nonfiction category, losing to the journalist William L. Shirer's The Rise and Fall of the Third Reich (1960). Asimov has stated that The Intelligent Man's Guide to Science led to his recognition as a major figure in the field of science writing.

Asimov's Guide to Science was reviewed by John Cheney in Contemporary Physics. Asimov's New Guide to Science received positive reviews from Paul Stuewe in Quill & Quire, Margrett J. McFadden in Voice of Youth Advocates, and Robert H. Bell in Science Books & Films, and a mixed review from E. L. Williams in Choice. The book was also reviewed by Jim Pirie in The Chemical Engineer and the geneticist H. Bentley Glass in The Quarterly Review of Biology.

Stuewe considered the book well-written, and credited Asimov with covering developments in technology since the publication of Asimov's Guide to Science. McFadden considered the book enjoyable to read, and praised Asimov for presenting new information "from dinosaurs to robots, the solar system to new physics discoveries". Bell considered the book thorough and engaging, crediting Asimov with "encyclopedic knowledge of astronomy, geology, physics, and chemistry" and "considerable understanding and knowledge of organic chemistry, cellular function and theory, microbiology, the human body and its needs, evolution, and the mind", and providing useful "figures, sketches, and maps". Williams complimented Asimov for his updated treatment of artificial intelligence, computers, cancer, the solar system, quasars, black holes, evolution, and the energy crisis, but considered it disappointing that there was no update on genetic engineering. Williams also commented that, "There are fewer photographs and their quality is not as good as in the 1972 edition. The table of contents has been divided into very helpful subheadings, making it easy to use as a quick reference. The name and subject indexes are good."

== See also ==
- Isaac Asimov bibliography
- Isaac Asimov bibliography (alphabetical)
- Isaac Asimov bibliography (chronological)
