= Asimov (crater) =

Crater on Mars

Asimov Crater
- Asimov Crater, mosaic image compiled from data collected by HiRISE on the Mars Reconnaissance Orbiter (MRO) over multiple years.
- Planet: Mars
- Region: Noachis quadrangle
- Coordinates: 47.0°S 355.05°W
- Quadrangle: Noachis
- Diameter: 84.0 km (52.2 mi)
- Eponym: Isaac Asimov (1920–1992), an American biochemist and writer

Asimov Crater is an impact crater in the Noachis quadrangle of Mars, located at 47.0° S and 355.05° W. It is 84.0 km (52.2 mi) in diameter and was named after Isaac Asimov (1920–1992), an American biochemist and writer. The name was officially adopted on May 4, 2009.

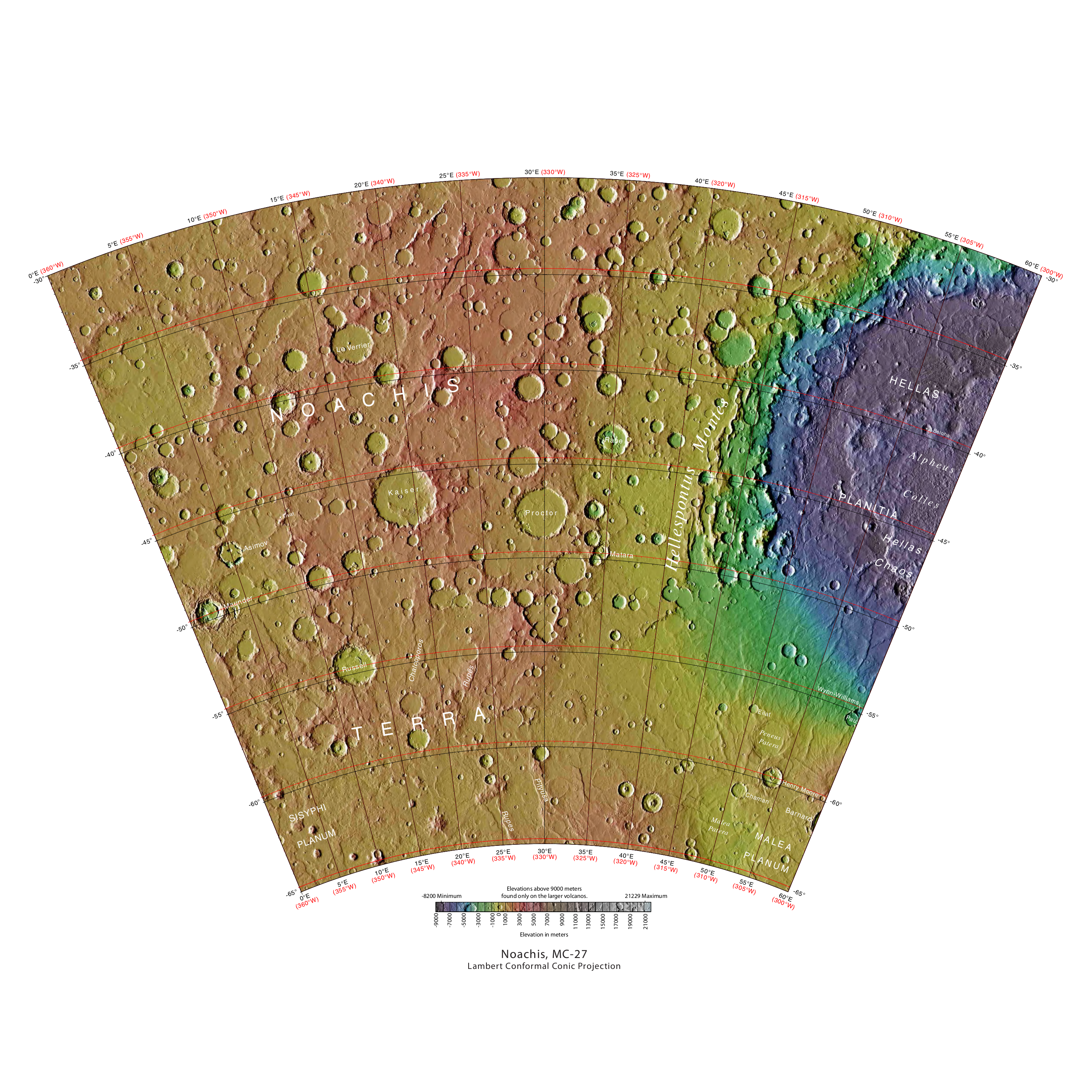
Topographical map showing location of Asimov Crater and other nearby craters
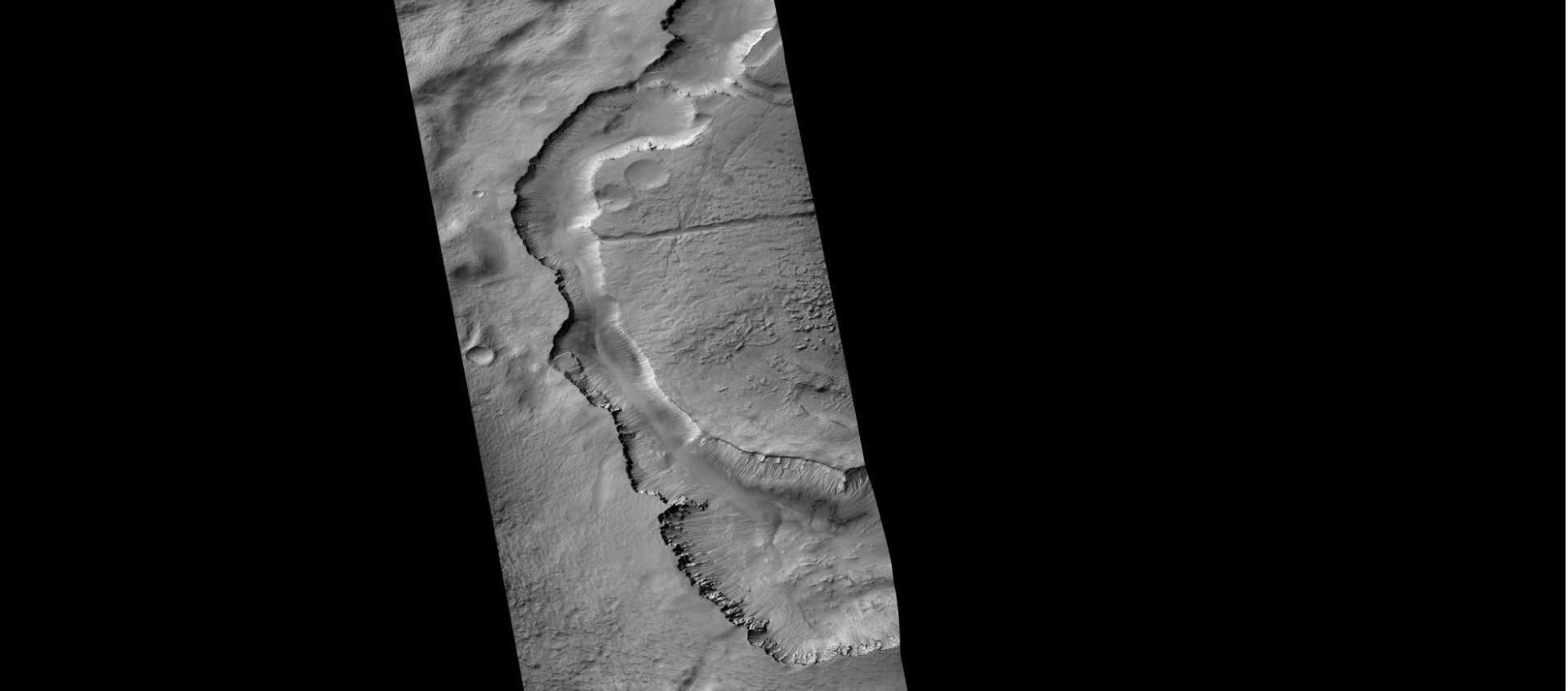
Western side of Asimov crater, as seen by CTX camera on Mars Reconnaissance Orbiter.

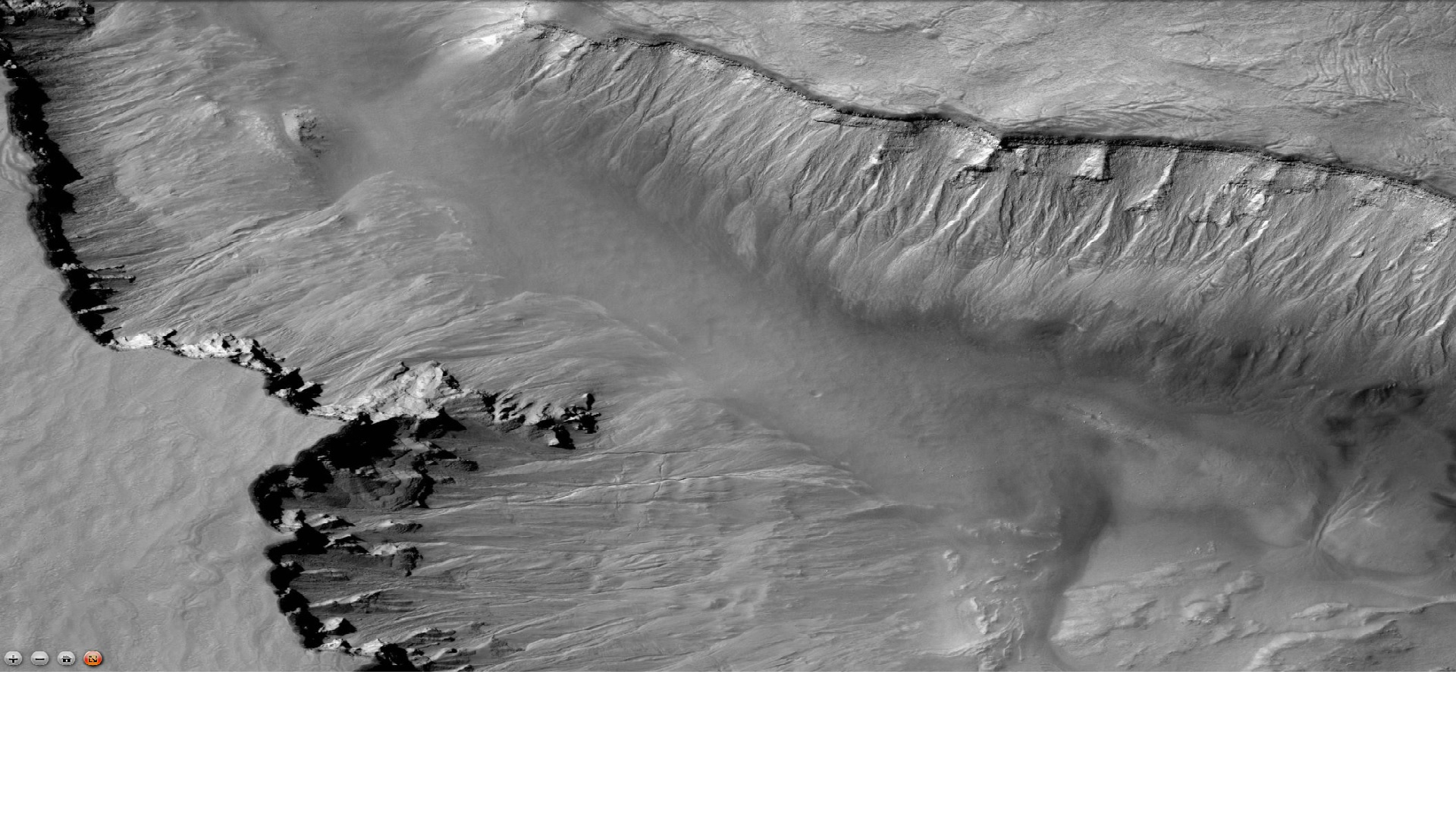
Layers and gullies in Asimov crater, as seen by CTX camera on Mars Reconnaissance Orbiter. Note: this is an enlargement of the previous image.

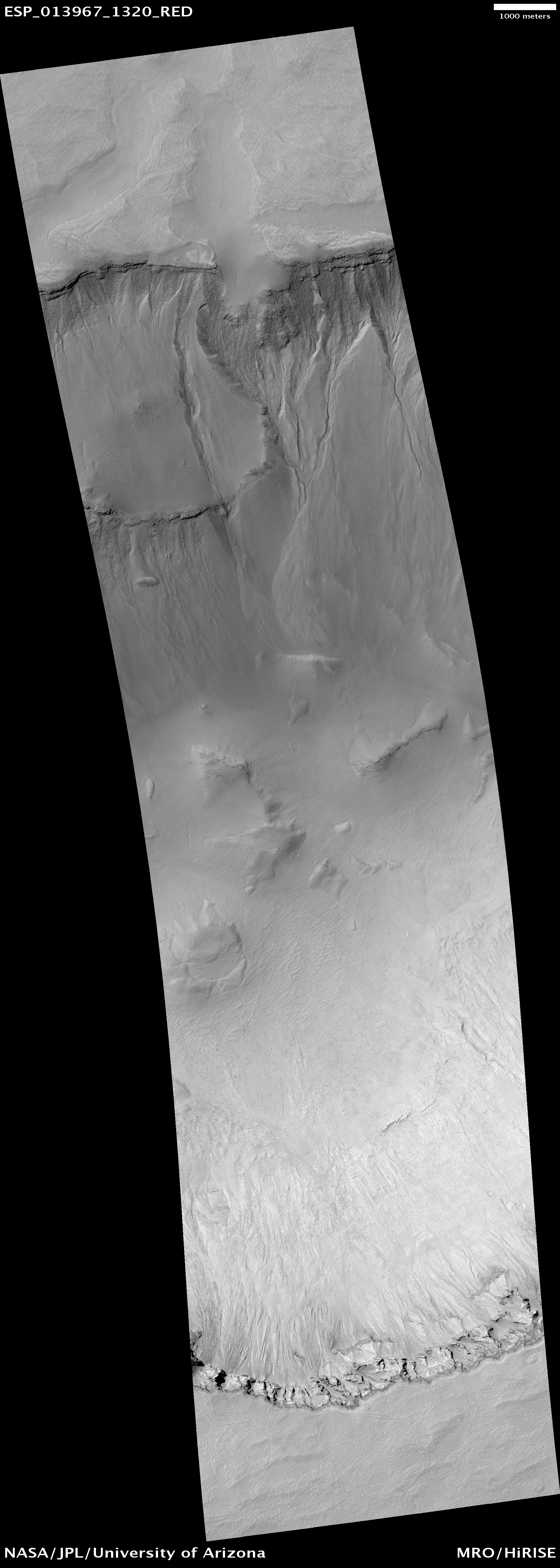
Asimov Crater, as seen by HiRISE. Bottom of picture shows southeastern wall of crater. Top of picture is edge of mound that fills most of the crater.

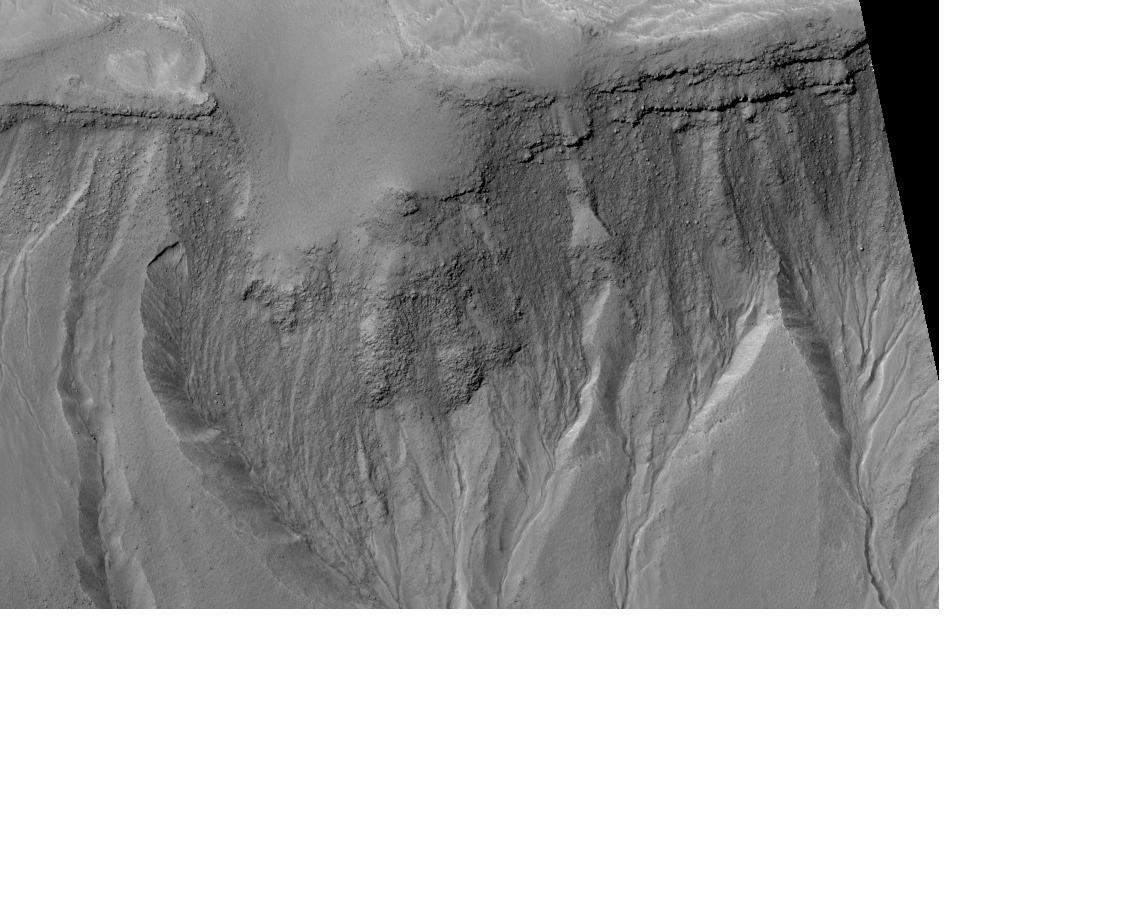
Gullies on mound in Asimov Crater, as seen by HiRISE.

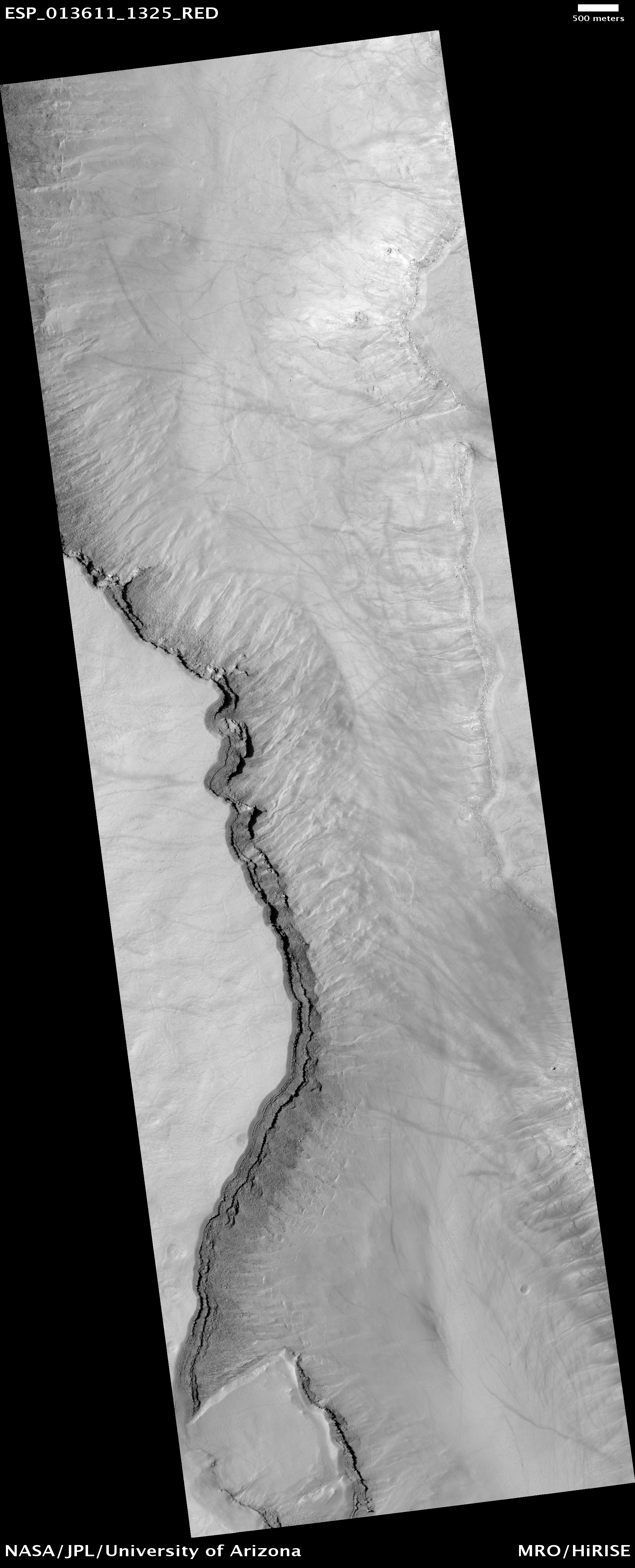
Layers in west slope of Asimov Crater, as seen by HiRISE.

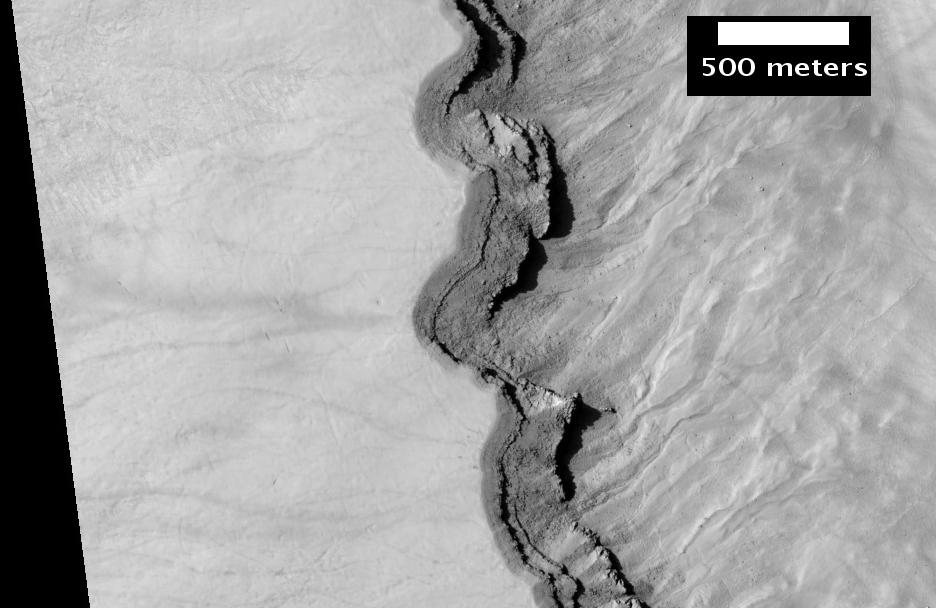
Close-up of layers in west slope of Asimov Crater. Shadows show the overhang. Some of the layers are much more resistant to erosion, so they stick out. Image from HiRISE.

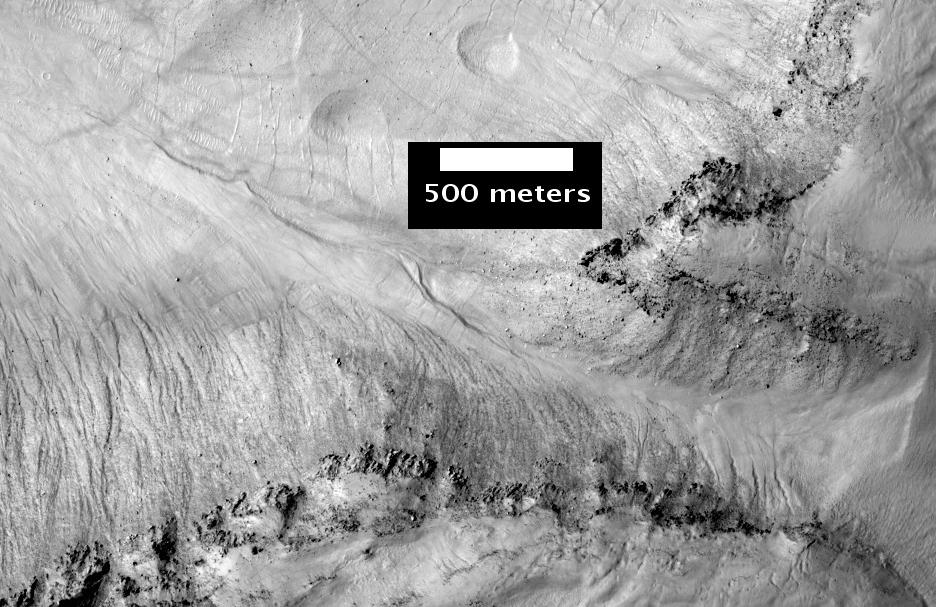
East Slope of Central Pit in Asimov Crater, as seen by HiRISE. Click on image to see more details of the many gullies.

Steep slope on Asimov Crater.

== Gullies in Asimov ==
Asimov contains many gullies. Martian gullies are small, incised networks of narrow channels and their associated downslope sediment deposits, found on the planet of Mars. They are named for their resemblance to terrestrial gullies. First discovered on images from Mars Global Surveyor, they occur on steep slopes, especially on the walls of craters. Usually, each gully has a dendritic alcove at its head, a fan-shaped apron at its base, and a single thread of incised channel linking the two, giving the whole gully an hourglass shape. They are believed to be relatively young because they have few, if any craters.

A subclass of gullies is also found cut into the faces of sand dunes which themselves considered to be quite young. On the basis of their form, aspects, positions, and location amongst and apparent interaction with features thought to be rich in water ice, many researchers believed that the processes carving the gullies involve liquid water. However, this remains a topic of active research.

As soon as gullies were discovered, researchers began to image many gullies over and over, looking for possible changes. By 2006, some changes were found. Later, with further analysis it was determined that the changes could have occurred by dry granular flows rather than being driven by flowing water. With continued observations many more changes were found in Gasa Crater and others. With more repeated observations, still more changes have been found; since the changes occur in the winter and spring, experts tend to believe that gullies were formed from dry ice. Before-and-after images demonstrated the timing of this activity coincided with seasonal carbon-dioxide frost and temperatures that would not have allowed for liquid water. When dry ice frost changes to a gas, it may lubricate dry material to flow especially on steep slopes.

== See also ==
- List of craters on Mars
