= The Death Dealers =

1958 mystery novel by Isaac Asimov

- First edition
- Author: Isaac Asimov
- Cover artist: Robert A. Maguire
- Language: English
- Genre: Mystery
- Publisher: Avon
- Publication date: 1958
- Publication place: United States
- Media type: Print (Hardcover & Paperback)
- Pages: 189

The Death Dealers is a 1958 mystery novel by American writer Isaac Asimov (later republished as A Whiff of Death, Asimov's preferred title). It is about a university professor whose research student dies while conducting an experiment. The professor attempts to determine if the death was accident, suicide or murder.

The novel was Asimov's first novel-length mystery (non-science fiction) story. He had already published several mystery short stories, later collected as Asimov's Mysteries (1968), in some of which the mystery was solved by applying known science. Asimov's previous two novels from his Robots series combined mystery with science fiction.

== Plot summary ==
One Thursday afternoon, Professor Brade goes to visit his graduate student's laboratory. He finds Ralph Neufeld dead, having inhaled hydrogen cyanide. In his experiment, he had somehow used sodium cyanide instead of sodium acetate, both white powders. Later, Brade is questioned by Detective Doheny, who is in charge of Ralph's case. When he gets home, he reveals to his wife his suspicions that Ralph's death was murder. She cautions him not to tell this to anyone, as he would destroy any chance of getting an associate professorship and tenure.

The next day, Brade meets with emeritus professor Cap Anson, who seems to blame him for Ralph's death. They visit the zoo together, and Anson encourages Brade to go into comparative biochemistry. Brade refuses, saying he wants to continue Ralph's work in chemical kinetics. Anson tells him that Professor Littleby (head of the chemistry department) has decided not to renew Brade's contract.

On Sunday, Brade reads through Ralph's research notebooks and realizes that Ralph's data had been faked, a cardinal sin in science. When Doheny returns, Brade tells him about the faking, suggesting it as a possible motive for suicide. Doheny, however, twists it around and says that Brade might have been trying to protect his own reputation by hiding the fraud.

The next day Brade again meets with Cap Anson, and immediately afterward in the lab, is almost killed by an oxygen cylinder which has been sabotaged. Now resolved to solve the mystery, he questions Ralph's fiancé Roberta Goodhue in the presence of Doheny. She admits that she and Ralph had had an argument about the faked data. The only person who could have overheard was Cap Anson. Brade accuses Anson of killing Ralph to prevent him from publishing the faked data (but does not mention the attempt on his own life). Anson denies the murder, but Doheny then tricks Anson into revealing that he knows about the attempt on Brade's life. Anson confesses to murdering Ralph and attempting to murder Brade.

== Background science ==
The story hinges on two chemical facts. First, the victim Neufeld was in the habit of sniffing at the open neck of a flask in order to check that a reaction was occurring. Generally chemists must regard all chemicals as poison, but this habit was common practice and would have been safe with the chemicals he intended to use. Substituting cyanide for acetate in the acidic solution produced hydrogen cyanide gas, which killed him. (However, the actual lethal dose of the volatile gas would be substantially higher.)

Second, valves on oxygen cylinders are never lubricated with oil, because oxygen under high pressure reacts with hydrocarbons to produce explosive ozonide compounds. Brade notices the oil on the valve in time to save his life. Doheny tricks Anson by pretending to turn on the oxygen in his presence, causing him to warn Doheny to stop, revealing that he knew about the oil. Brade, however, had already cleaned the valve to remove the oil. (A similar mechanism of murder appeared in Asimov's 1957 story "The Dust of Death".)

== Characters ==
- Louis Brade – an assistant professor of organic chemistry.
- Doris Brade – his wife.
- Ralph Neufeld – a paranoid research student of Brade. From Europe. Survivor of "something unpleasant" in which father and sister were killed.
- Cap Anson – an organic chemist and Brade's former teacher.
- Roberta Goodhue – another research student of Brade.
- Merill Foster – an assistant professor of organic chemistry. Colleague of Brade.
- Otto Ranke – a physical chemist. Colleague of Brade.
- Arthur Littleby – head of Brade's department.
- Jack Doheny – a policeman.

== Adaptations ==
- Formula of Death (2012), TV movie directed by Behdad Avand Amini
