= The Dream Master =

Novel by Roger Zelazny

- Cover of first edition (paperback)
- Author: Roger Zelazny
- Cover artist: Frank Kelly Freas
- Language: English
- Genre: Science fiction
- Publisher: Ace Books
- Publication date: 1966
- Publication place: United States
- Media type: Print (hardback & paperback)
- Pages: 155
- Award: Nebula Award for Best Novella for "He Who Shapes" (1965)

The Dream Master (1966) is a science fiction novel by American writer Roger Zelazny, based on the novella He Who Shapes. Zelazny's original title was The Ides of Octember. He Who Shapes won the 1965 Nebula Award for Best Novella (which it shared with The Saliva Tree by Brian W. Aldiss in a tie).

== Plot summary ==
In the future, overpopulation and technological advances have created a world where humanity suffocates psychologically beneath its own mass while abiding in relative physical comfort. This is a world ripe for psychotherapeutic innovations, such as the "neuroparticipant therapy" in which the protagonist, Charles Render, is considered foremost in the field.

Patients connect to a virtual reality-style simulation controlled directly by the analyst's mind; the analyst then works with the patient to construct dreams, nightmares which afford insight into the underlying neuroses of the patient, and in some cases the possibility of direct intervention. As an example, one man mentally immersed in a fantasy world sees it destroyed at Render's hands, and is thus cured of his obsession with it.

Render takes on a patient with an unusual problem. Eileen Shallot aspires to become a neuroparticipant therapist herself, but is hampered by congenital blindness. She would be unable to convincingly construct visual dreams for them; indeed, in a case of eye-envy, her own neurotic desire to see through the eyes of her patients might prevent her from treating them effectively. As she explains to Render, if a practicing neuroparticipant therapist is willing to work with her, he can expose her to the full range of visual stimuli in a controlled environment, free of her own attachments to the issue, and enable her to pursue her career.

Despite his better sense and the advice of colleagues, Render agrees to go along with the treatment. As they progress, Eileen's hunger for visual stimulation continues to grow, and she begins to assert her will against Render's, subsuming him into her own dreams.

== Other media ==
In 1981, Zelazny wrote a film outline based on The Dream Master, which was purchased by 20th Century Fox and later developed into the film Dreamscape. Because he wrote the outline but neither the treatment nor script, his name did not appear in the credits. Claims that he had his name removed from the credits are unfounded.

The plot of The Dream Master inspired Gary Numan's song "I Am Render" (on Numan's 1983 album Warriors).

== See also ==
- "Dreams Are Sacred", a short story by Peter Phillips.
