= Isaac Asimov Presents The Great SF Stories 10 (1948) =

- Editors: Isaac Asimov; Martin H. Greenberg
- Cover artist: Robert André
- Language: English
- Series: Isaac Asimov Presents The Great SF Stories
- Genre: Science fiction
- Publisher: DAW Books
- Publication date: August 1983
- Publication place: United States
- Media type: Print (hardback & paperback)
- Preceded by: Isaac Asimov Presents The Great SF Stories 9 (1947)
- Followed by: Isaac Asimov Presents The Great SF Stories 11 (1949)

Isaac Asimov Presents The Great SF Stories 10 (1948) is the tenth volume of Isaac Asimov Presents The Great SF Stories, which is a series of short story collections, edited by Isaac Asimov and Martin H. Greenberg, which attempts to list the great science fiction stories from the Golden Age of Science Fiction. They date the Golden Age as beginning in 1939 and lasting until 1963. The book was later reprinted as the second half of Isaac Asimov Presents The Golden Years of Science Fiction, Fifth Series with the first half being Isaac Asimov Presents The Great SF Stories 9 (1947). This volume was originally published by DAW books in August 1983.

== Contents ==
- "Don't Look Now" by Henry Kuttner
- "He Walked Around the Horses" by H. Beam Piper
- "The Strange Case of John Kingman" by Murray Leinster
- "That Only a Mother" by Judith Merril
- "The Monster" by A. E. van Vogt
- "Dreams Are Sacred" by Peter Phillips
- "Mars is Heaven!" by Ray Bradbury
- "Thang" by Martin Gardner
- "Brooklyn Project" by William Tenn
- "Ring Around the Redhead" by John D. MacDonald
- "Period Piece" by J. J. Coupling
- "Dormant" by A. E. van Vogt
- "In Hiding" by Wilmar H. Shiras
- "Knock" by Fredric Brown
- "A Child is Crying" by John D. MacDonald
- "Late Night Final" by Eric Frank Russell
