= The Paradox Men =

1949 novel by Charles L. Harness

First edition, published by Ace Books. Cover art by Richard M. Powers.

The Paradox Men is a science fiction novel by American writer Charles L. Harness, his first novel. Initially published as a novella, "Flight into Yesterday", in the May 1949 issue of Startling Stories, it was republished as The Paradox Men in 1953. The "science-fiction classic" is both "a tale dominated by space-opera extravagances" and "a severely articulate narrative analysis of the implications of Arnold J. Toynbee's A Study of History." Boucher and McComas described it as "fine swashbuckling adventure ... so infinitely intricate that you may never quite understand what it's about." P. Schuyler Miller described it as "action-entertainment, fast-paced enough that you don't stop to bother with inconsistencies or improbabilities."

In his introduction in the 1967 Four Square paperback reprint of the novel, Brian Aldiss terms it a major example of the "Widescreen Baroque" style in science fiction, and John Clute terms it "the kind of tale which transforms traditional space opera into an arena where a vast array of characters can act their hearts out, where anything can be said with a wink or dead seriously, and any kind of story be told." In Trillion Year Spree, Aldiss and Wingrove report the novel "plays high, wide, and handsome with space and time, buzzes around the solar system like a demented hornet, [and] is witty, profound, and trivial all in one breath." The Paradox Men features the concept of personal force fields which protect people against high-velocity weapons like guns but not against knives or swords, an idea later used in Frank Herbert's Dune (1965).
