= Isaac Asimov Presents The Great SF Stories 11 (1949) =

- First edition
- Editors: Isaac Asimov; Martin H. Greenberg
- Cover artist: Michelangelo Miani
- Language: English
- Series: Isaac Asimov Presents The Great SF Stories
- Genre: Science fiction
- Publisher: DAW Books
- Publication date: March 1984
- Publication place: United States
- Media type: Print (hardback & paperback)
- Preceded by: Isaac Asimov Presents The Great SF Stories 10 (1948)
- Followed by: Isaac Asimov Presents The Great SF Stories 12 (1950)

Isaac Asimov Presents The Great SF Stories 11 (1949) is the eleventh volume of Isaac Asimov Presents The Great SF Stories, which is a series of short story collections, edited by Isaac Asimov and Martin H. Greenberg, which attempts to list the great science fiction stories from the Golden Age of Science Fiction. They date the Golden Age as beginning in 1939 and lasting until 1963. The book was later reprinted as the first half of Isaac Asimov Presents The Golden Years of Science Fiction, Sixth Series with the second half being Isaac Asimov Presents The Great SF Stories 12 (1950). This volume was originally published by DAW books in March 1984.

== Contents ==
- "The Red Queen's Race" by Isaac Asimov
- "Flaw" by John D. MacDonald
- "Private Eye" by Lewis Padgett
- "Manna" by Peter Phillips
- "The Prisoner in the Skull" by Lewis Padgett
- "Alien Earth" by Edmond Hamilton
- "History Lesson" by Arthur C. Clarke
- "Eternity Lost" by Clifford D. Simak
- "The Only Thing We Learn" by C. M. Kornbluth
- "Private—Keep Out!" by Philip MacDonald
- "The Hurkle is a Happy Beast" by Theodore Sturgeon
- "Kaleidoscope" by Ray Bradbury
- "Defense Mechanism" by Katherine MacLean
- "Cold War" by Henry Kuttner
- "The Witches of Karres" by James H. Schmitz
