= Charles L. Harness =

American writer

- Born: Charles Leonard Harness; December 29, 1915; Colorado City, Texas, U.S.
- Died: September 20, 2005 (aged 89); North Newton, Kansas, U.S.
- Education: George Washington University
- Occupations: Novelist, short story writer
- Writing career
- Genre: Science fiction

Charles Leonard Harness (December 29, 1915 – September 20, 2005) was an American science fiction writer.

== Biography ==
Harness was born in Colorado City, Texas, and grew up just outside it, then later in Fort Worth. He earned degrees in chemistry and law from George Washington University and worked as a patent attorney in Connecticut and Washington, D.C., from 1947 to 1981. Several of Harness's works draw on his background as a lawyer.

Harness died in 2005, at the age of 89, in North Newton, Kansas.

== Writing career ==
Harness's first story, "Time Trap" (1948), shows many of his recurring themes, among them art, time travel, and a hero undergoing a quasi-transcendental experience.

His first novel, The Paradox Men, was his most famous. It was first published under the name Flight into Yesterday, as a novella in the May 1949 issue of Startling Stories (pp. 9–79). It was expanded to a full-length novel (Bouregy & Curl, 1953), and was renamed The Paradox Men by Donald Wollheim and reprinted as the first half of Ace Double #D-118 in 1955. Much later Harness thanked Wollheim for the title that "turned out to be irresistible". The "science-fiction classic" is both "a tale dominated by space-opera extravagances" and "a severely articulate narrative analysis of the implications of Arnold J. Toynbee's A Study of History". Boucher and McComas described it as "fine swashbuckling adventure ... so infinitely intricate that you may never quite understand what it's about". P. Schuyler Miller described it as "action-entertainment, fast-paced enough that you don't stop to bother with inconsistencies or improbabilities".

In his introduction in the 1967 Four Square paperback reprint of the novel, Brian Aldiss terms it a major example of the "Widescreen baroque" style in science fiction, and John Clute terms it "the kind of tale which transforms traditional space opera into an arena where a vast array of characters can act their hearts out, where anything can be said with a wink or dead seriously, and any kind of story be told". In Trillion Year Spree, Aldiss and Wingrove report the novel "plays high, wide, and handsome with space and time, buzzes around the solar system like a demented hornet, [and] is witty, profound, and trivial all in one breath". The Paradox Men features the concept of force fields which protect people against high-velocity weapons like guns but not against knives or swords, an idea later used in Frank Herbert's Dune (1965).

In 1953, Harness also published his most famous single story, "The Rose", which first appeared in the British magazine Authentic Science Fiction, then as the main novella in a UK mass-market paperback collection assembled and introduced by Michael Moorcock. The story did not appear in the United States until 1969.

Other Harness' stories include "An Ornament to his Profession", "The Alchemist" and "Stalemate in Space". His story "The New Reality" has been called "SF's best Adam & Eve story" by Brian Stableford. His novel Redworld is one of the very few science fiction novels in which all characters are aliens.

Harness's ideas influenced numerous writers and he continued to publish until 2001, being nominated for multiple Hugo and Nebula awards. In 2004 he was named Author of Distinction by the Science Fiction and Fantasy Writers of America.

== Awards ==
- "The Rose", novella nominated for the Retro-Hugo Award in 2004
- "The Alchemist", novella nominated for the Hugo and Nebula awards for 1966
- "An Ornament to His Profession", novelette nominated for the Hugo and Nebula awards for 1966
- "Probable Cause", novella nominated for the Nebula award for 1969
- "Summer Solstice", novella nominated for the Hugo award in 1985

== Bibliography ==
=== Short stories ===
- "Time Trap", Astounding Stories (August 1948)
- "Flight into Yesterday", Startling Stories (May 1949)
- "Summer Solstice", Terry Carr's Best Science Fiction of the Year (June 1984)

=== Novels ===
- Flight into Yesterday (1953); based on a 1949 novella; reprinted as The Paradox Men, 1955 by Ace Books and thereafter
- The Ring of Ritornel (1968)
- Wolfhead (1978)
- The Catalyst (1980)
- Firebird (1981)
- The Venetian Court (1982)
- Redworld (1986)
- Krono (1988)
- Lurid Dreams (1990)
- Lunar Justice (1991)
- Drunkard's Endgame (1999) (in Rings, an omnibus edition of four novels by Harness from NESFA Press ISBN 1-886778-16-7)
- Cybele, With Bluebonnets (2002)

=== Collections ===
- The Rose (1966)
- An Ornament to His Profession (1998) (NESFA Press reprint collection, ISBN 1-886778-09-4)
