= Isaac Asimov Presents The Great SF Stories 14 (1952) =

- First edition
- Editors: Isaac Asimov; Martin H. Greenberg
- Cover artist: Tony Roberts
- Language: English
- Series: Isaac Asimov Presents The Great SF Stories
- Genre: Science fiction
- Publisher: DAW Books
- Publication date: January 1986
- Publication place: United States
- Media type: Print (hardback & paperback)
- Preceded by: Isaac Asimov Presents The Great SF Stories 13 (1951)
- Followed by: Isaac Asimov Presents The Great SF Stories 15 (1953)

Isaac Asimov Presents The Great SF Stories 14 (1952) is the fourteenth volume of Isaac Asimov Presents The Great SF Stories, which is a series of short story collections, edited by Isaac Asimov and Martin H. Greenberg, which attempts to list the great science fiction stories from the Golden Age of Science Fiction. They date the Golden Age as beginning in 1939 and lasting until 1963. This volume was originally published by DAW books in January 1986.

== Contents ==
- "The Pedestrian" by Ray Bradbury
- "The Moon Is Green" by Fritz Leiber
- "Lost Memory" by Peter Phillips
- "What Have I Done?" by Mark Clifton
- "Fast Falls the Eventide" by Eric Frank Russell
- "The Business, as Usual" by Mack Reynolds
- "A Sound of Thunder" by Ray Bradbury
- "Hobson's Choice" by Alfred Bester
- "Yesterday House" by Fritz Leiber
- "The Snowball Effect" by Katherine MacLean
- "Delay in Transit" by F. L. Wallace
- "Game for Blondes" by John D. MacDonald
- "The Altar at Midnight" by Cyril Kornbluth
- "Command Performance" by Walter M. Miller, Jr.
- "The Martian Way" by Isaac Asimov
- "The Impacted Man" by Robert Sheckley
- "What's It Like Out There?" by Edmond Hamilton
- "Sail On! Sail On!" by Philip José Farmer
- "Cost of Living" by Robert Sheckley
