= The Moment of Eclipse =

1970 collection of science fiction short stories

- First edition
- Author: Brian Aldiss
- Cover artist: Jerome Gask
- Language: English
- Genre: Science fiction
- Publisher: Faber and Faber
- Publication date: 1970
- Publication place: United Kingdom
- Media type: Print (hardback & paperback)
- Pages: 215 pp.
- ISBN: 0-571-09570-4

The Moment of Eclipse is a 1970 collection of science fiction short stories written by Brian Aldiss between 1965 and 1970. It was originally published by Faber & Faber. In 1972, the collection, in its entirety, received the first BSFA Award for short fiction published in 1970-71.

== Contents ==
- Poem at a Lunar Eclipse (poem by Thomas Hardy)
- The Moment of Eclipse (1969)
- The Day We Embarked for Cythera . . . (1970)
- Orgy of the Living and the Dying (1970)
- Super-Toys Last All Summer Long (1969)
- The Village Swindler (1968)
- Down the Up Escalation (1967)
- That Uncomfortable Pause Between Life and Art . . . (1969)
- Confluence (1967)
- Heresies of the Huge God (1966)
- The Circulation of the Blood . . . (1966)
- . . . And the Stagnation of the Heart (1968)
- The Worm That Flies (1968)
- Working in the Spaceship Yards (1969)
- Swastika! (1968)
- Acknowledgements (1969)
