= Groundwork =

Groundwork or ground work may refer to:

== Literature ==
- Groundwork of the Metaphysic of Morals or simply Groundwork, a 1785 philosophical treatise by Immanuel Kant
- Groundwork, a 1997 novel by Robert Anthony Welch
- Groundwork, a 1983 biography of Charles Hamilton Houston by Genna Rae McNeil
- Ground Work: Before the War, a 1984 book of poetry by Robert Duncan
- Ground Work: Selected Poems and Essays, 1970-79, a 1990 book by Paul Auster
- Groundwork: Autobiographical Writings, 1979–2012, a 2020 book by Paul Auster
- Ground Works: Avante-Garde for Thee, a 2003 book edited by Christian Bök

== Music ==
- Groundwork, a 2010 mixtape by Yung Berg
- "Groundwork", a 2022 single by Ed Sheeran, Big Narstie and Papoose
- GroundWork Records, a record label co-founded by Jenn Korbee
- GroundWorks, a South African hip-hop group featuring Snazz D

== Organizations ==
- Groundwork UK, an environmental organisation working as a federation of trusts
- The Groundwork, an American technology firm
- Groundwork Collaborative, an American nonprofit organization

== Other ==
- Groundworker, a person who prepares land for building construction
- Ground fighting or ground work, hand-to-hand combat that takes place on the ground
- Ground work or ground training, a stage of horse training

== See also ==
- Earthworks (disambiguation)
