= Isaac Asimov Presents The Great SF Stories 12 (1950) =

- First edition
- Editors: Isaac Asimov; Martin H. Greenberg
- Cover artist: Dino Marsan
- Language: English
- Series: Isaac Asimov Presents The Great SF Stories
- Genre: Science fiction
- Publisher: DAW Books
- Publication date: September 1984
- Publication place: United States
- Media type: Print (hardback & paperback)
- Preceded by: Isaac Asimov Presents The Great SF Stories 11 (1949)
- Followed by: Isaac Asimov Presents The Great SF Stories 13 (1951)

Isaac Asimov Presents The Great SF Stories 12 (1950) is the twelfth volume of Isaac Asimov Presents The Great SF Stories, which is a series of short story collections, edited by Isaac Asimov and Martin H. Greenberg, which attempts to list the great science fiction stories from the Golden Age of Science Fiction. They date the Golden Age as beginning in 1939 and lasting until 1963. The book was later reprinted as the second half of Isaac Asimov Presents The Golden Years of Science Fiction, Sixth Series with the first half being Isaac Asimov Presents The Great SF Stories 11 (1949). It was the last book in the series to be reprinted as part of the Isaac Asimov Presents The Golden Years of Science Fiction series. This volume was originally published by DAW books in September 1984.

== Contents ==
- "Not with a Bang" by Damon Knight
- "Spectator Sport" by John D. MacDonald
- "There Will Come Soft Rains" by Ray Bradbury
- "Dear Devil" by Eric Frank Russell
- "Scanners Live in Vain" by Cordwainer Smith
- "Born of Man and Woman" by Richard Matheson
- "The Little Black Bag" by C. M. Kornbluth
- "Enchanted Village" by A. E. van Vogt
- "Oddy and Id" by Alfred Bester
- "The Sack" by William Morrison
- "The Silly Season" by C. M. Kornbluth
- "Misbegotten Missionary" by Isaac Asimov
- "To Serve Man" by Damon Knight
- "Coming Attraction" by Fritz Leiber
- "A Subway Named Mobius" by A. J. Deutsch
- "Process" by A. E. van Vogt
- "The Mindworm" by C. M. Kornbluth
- "The New Reality" by Charles L. Harness
