= An Age =

1967 novel by Brian Aldiss

- Cover of first edition (hardcover)
- Author: Brian Aldiss
- Language: English
- Genre: Science fiction
- Publisher: Faber & Faber
- Publication date: 1967
- Publication place: United Kingdom
- Media type: Print (Hardcover and paperback)
- Pages: 224

An Age (published in the United States as Cryptozoic!) is a 1967 science fiction novel by English writer Brian Aldiss. The book, set principally in 2093, combines the popular science fiction themes of time travel, totalitarian dystopia, and the untapped potential of the human mind. It was nominated for a Ditmar Award in 1969 in the "Best International Science Fiction of any length, or collection" category.

== Plot introduction ==
The future society described in the novel has developed a form of psychological time travel called "mind travel" by which, with the aid of the psychoactive drug CSD (no explanation of this acronym is given, though its mind-altering effects are probably a reference to LSD) can travel in their minds to the distant past. While mind traveling, they are unable to interact with the world of the past, but they can sense and interact with other travelers from their own time. It has been discovered that the functioning of the human mind is influenced and limited by "the undermind", a mysterious force which aids in mind travel.

== Plot summary ==
The story concerns Edward Bush, an artist searching for inspiration in the past. When Bush returns from a long stay in the Jurassic, he finds that his nation (presumably the United Kingdom) has been taken over by a totalitarian government. He is immediately drafted into the military and given the mission to kill the scientist Silverstone (whom he had met as "Stein" in the past). As Bush mind travels again to fulfill his mission, he learns of Silverstone's new philosophical and scientific discoveries. Bush and Silverstone meet, travel to the Cryptozoic with a few allies, and decide together to usher in a new era of humanity, one enlightened by the realization that time flows backward. Bush returns to his present time, only to be imprisoned in a mental institution. Bush's father tries to see him but is prevented by doctors, who explain his son has had a breakdown brought on by excessive mind travel. Outside, a girl stands watching the hospital, presumably planning a rescue.

== Reception ==
Algis Budrys reviewed the novel unfavorably, calling it "a useless book [which] tells us that the writer thinks he's clever. It even proves that he is, indeed, notionally facile, and perhaps admirable for having gone into doing advertising".

At the time of writing, Western public opinion was concerned with the Political abuse of psychiatry in the Soviet Union – some Soviet dissidents undergoing experiences reminiscent of the later part of "An Age".
