= The Malacia Tapestry =

1976 novel by Brian Aldiss

- First edition
- Author: Brian Aldiss
- Cover artist: Giovan Battista Tiepolo
- Published: 1976
- Publisher: Jonathan Cape

The Malacia Tapestry is a fantasy-historical novel by British writer Brian Aldiss, published in 1976. The story takes place in a fictional port city called Malacia, which is an alternate history version of a Renaissance city-state. It tells the story of a poor young actor named Perian de Chirolo who hopes to change his station in life so he can marry a wealthy merchant's daughter. While Malacia is considered a near-utopia, the happiness in the city belies the authoritarian rule of the powerful Supreme Council, which uses fear to prevent progress.

== Plot ==
The Malacia Tapestry is a novel about Perian de Chirolo, a poor young man who is both a rogue and rarely-working actor, in the imaginary city of Malacia, which resembles Renaissance Venice. De Chirolo lives in a humble attic, cadges meals and drinks in taverns, seeks love affairs with many women, and mingles with artists, astrologers, magicians, and nobility in the bustling port town. As the story opens, De Chirolo enjoys his free time with his young friend Guy de Lambert, who is also an actor. The pair pass their days drinking, jesting, and having affairs with women.

Malacia has a legendary curse that it can never progress or change, which is enforced by a powerful Supreme Council, which also eliminates heretics and other freethinkers. The craftsman Otto Bengtsohn, though, defies the anti-progress edicts and invents a type of early photography. Bengtsohn uses the camera to make slides for a play, which is funded by the powerful and wealthy merchant Andrus Hoytola. De Chirolo falls in love with Hoytola's daughter, Armida, who is acting in the play. De Chirolo starts a secret love affair with the wealthy Armida, but she tells him they cannot marry unless he achieves enough in life to make an acceptable mate.

Despite De Chirolo's professions of love to Armida, and their secret plan to marry, De Chirolo has sexual encounters with a number of women. De Chirolo starts to fall in love, and decides to cease his womanizing. As De Chirolo works with the other participants in the play, he meets working-class apprentices who call for progress and changes in society, which is against the law in Malacia. As De Chirolo tries to rise in Malacian society, he feels frustrated at his lack of progress in being accepted by the nobles.

When Andrus Hoytola invites de Chirolo to join the annual hunt for "ancestral animals" (rare examples of the almost-extinct dinosaurs), de Chirolo is pleased to mingle with nobles and slay a seven-ton Devil-Jaw. However, de Chirolo's rise in Malacian society unravels when Andrus Hoytola learns that Bengtsohn is a Progressive who hopes that his zahnoscope slides can be used to foment a revolution against the ruling class. As the elder Hoytola suspects that de Chirolo is in league with Bengtsohn, de Chirolo ends up banished from society and Bengtsohn is killed. As the story ends, Bengtsohn's fellow Progressives try to recruit de Chirolo to join their plans for a class revolution.

== Characters ==
- Perian de Chirolo: young man who works occasionally as an actor
- Guy de Lambant: young man in the same theatre troupe as Perian de Chirolo and one of his friends; he is described as handsome, witty, idle and vain
- Pozzi Kemperer: a middle-aged theatre impresario and actor, sometimes hires de Chirolo and de Lambant
- La Singla: beautiful young actress with golden hair and an ample figure who is married to Kemperer, she has amorous encounters with de Chirolo
- Caylus Nortolini: a "lordly young man" known as a ladies' man and swordfighter, who is liked for his generosity buying drinks at local taverns
- Bedalar Nortolini: an attractive young woman, Caylus' sister, and a friend to Armida Hoytola, the daughter of a wealthy merchant
- Armida Hoytola: the beautiful, slender 18-year-old daughter of Andrus Hoytola, a wealthy merchant
- Andrus Hoytola: a wealthy merchant who seeks to rise in Malacian society, he lives in a mansion and owns 80 horses and a country estate, Juracia

=== Progressives ===
- Otto Bengtsohn: old inventor and craftsman from Tolkhorm, a northern town known for its enlightened Progressive political leanings; he has invented the zahnoscope, a Daguerreotype-style early camera
- Bonihatch: an apprentice to Bengtsohn and a fellow Progressive
- Letitia Zlatorog: an impoverished young seamstress; Bonihatch is in love with her and Perian tries to seduce her. She is also a Progressive

=== Minor characters ===
- Piebald Pete: a balding, impoverished marionette artisan, who once entertained in the houses of the nobility, but has now become mostly a busker on the streets
- Bledlore: a brilliant glassworker who once did work for the nobility, but who now has become impoverished, living in a shabby room atop a crumbling warehouse
- Yolaria: Armida's "whey-faced" old chaperone, she supervises most of Armida's social activities
- Man in black coat: this anonymous figure wears a large black coat and a black tricorne hat over a grey wig. His hat bears the Supreme Council's emblem, showing he is a representative of the powerful, but shadowy ruling body which ensures order and stability in Malacia through disappearances, torture and executions
- Captain John: A Captain in the Tuscady Heavy Cavalry, which is posted temporarily in Malacia to defend it from the Turkish attacks; he is in love with La Singla
- Katarina de Chirolo: Perian de Chirolo's sister, married to the rarely-home merchant Volpato; they live in a crumbling castle
- Elder de Chirolo: Perian de Chirolo's elderly, sick father; he is a scholar who is obsessed with his historical research and writing

== Setting ==
Malacia is a walled city with a port where merchant ships unload their cargo. The River Toi winds through the city. Stary Most ("old bridge" in Russian) is a busy market where street astrologers, busking jugglers, snake charmers, acrobats and prostitutes ply their trades amidst the market stalls. The Fragrant Quarter is the area where the spice ships used to unload, but now the old warehouses have mostly been converted to smaller units. To the north is countryside, and then in the distance, the Vokoban Mountains. To the south is a long, dusty road to Byzantium. To the south-east is the tree-lined Valmonal Canal. The Hoytola mansion is near the canal. To the west is the Prilipit Mountains, a jagged and distorted terrain where the Chabrizzi, a noble family, have their palace, which is filled with winding corridors and chained-up old "ancestral animals". In the country is Juracia, the Hoytola family's huge country estate, which includes vast wooded areas where "ancestral animals" still roam.

== Play within story ==
The novel has a fictional play within the story, Prince Mendicula: The Joyous Tragedy of the Prince and Patricia and General Gerald and Jemina. This play, written by Bengtsohn, is the work which the actors are portraying in the photo-play slides. In the play, the revolutionary-minded Bonihatch (Bengtsohn's young apprentice), plays the Prince; Armida plays his wife, the Princess Patricia; Perian plays General Gerald; and the young, poor seamstress Letitia Zlatorog plays Lady Jemina. The events in the play end up being paralleled by the events in the story (albeit with some changes of people), as Perian is in love with Armida in the story, while also trying to unsuccessfully seduce Letitia, and Perian encourages his best friend Guy to befriend Armida.

=== Plot ===
In the fictional play, Prince Mendicula is a powerful prince who has just conquered the kingdom of Gorica, which lies in ruins as a result of his attack. The Prince was aided in this military conquest by his General Gerald, a noble, rich friend. The Prince's wife is the beautiful Princess Patricia. General Gerald has no wife as the play starts, but he hopes to marry a woman from the conquered city, the Lady Jemina. As the Prince tours the captured city, he becomes entranced with a dark-haired woman who he meets at the inn he is staying in, and he makes drunken advances on her, which she rebuffs; unbeknownst to the Prince, the object of his affections was Lady Jemina.

During the time that the Prince is exploring Gorica, he worries that Patricia may have been unfaithful with General Gerald, so he rushes back, but he finds them asleep in separate rooms. Patricia smells the liquor on the Prince's breath, and draws away from his embrace. Her coolness plants a seed of anxiety in the Prince's mind regarding Patricia and the General. After struggling with his doubts, the Prince urges Patricia and the General to enjoy their friendship. When the Prince leaves to establish his rule in Gorica, the General takes Patricia to balls and opera shows. Patricia becomes less warm towards the Prince, which makes the Prince feel guilty for his attempted seduction of the dark-haired woman at the inn. The Prince begins to obsess over the dark-haired woman, seeing her at the inn and talking with her all night. When the Prince returns home in the early hours of the morning, he finds Patricia and the General together, walking in the garden, which they claim was a coincidental early arising.

The General tells the Prince that he wants the Prince to meet his unnamed bride-to-be soon (which we know to be Lady Jemina). The General praises the Prince for his enlightened attitude towards the General's relationship with Patricia and for the Prince's seeming lack of jealousy. The Prince accuses Patricia of a sexual relationship with the General, a suspicious attitude which only serves to push her more into the General's arms. Meanwhile, the Prince happens to encounter the dark-haired woman, who is upset that her husband-to-be is consorting with another woman. The Prince consoles the dark-haired woman and holds her, which leads to sexual intercourse.

The next day is the dark-haired woman's wedding day, so when she awakes, she feels she has betrayed the General, and says that she must die by suicide to end her dishonour. The Prince finds it a strange coincidence that the dark-haired woman's wedding is on the same day as General Gerald's wedding. When the Prince tells the dark-haired woman about his friend General Gerald's impending wedding, the dark-haired woman, Lady Jemina, is distraught even more.

When the Prince realizes that his lover is General Gerald's bride-to-be, the Prince tells Lady Jemina that Patricia has been spotless in her virtue. The Prince goes to Patricia and tells her he will cease looking at other women, and begs her forgiveness. Patricia is cool towards him and says she takes his guilt as an admission of having taken a lover. Patricia gets remote and haughty, and she tells the Prince that despite his repentance, it is too late, and that she is enjoying her affair with Gerald too much. The Prince is shocked at their affair, but Patricia insists the Prince must have known, as he encouraged them to spend time together. Patricia expresses scorn for the Prince, and even when he gets angry, she is only amused, and tells him that she is not attracted to him because the Prince is not frivolous and superficial enough, traits she has come to find relaxing and appealing.

When General Gerald enters, the Prince calls him out as a vile betrayer, and the Prince draws his sword. The General draws his sword, and they duel. The General is wounded, and falls back. The Prince hesitates from delivering the death blow, when suddenly a messenger runs in. The Lady Jemina has been found dead by suicide, dressed in her bridal gown. The Prince is stricken by grief, and falls back. Seeing his opportunity, the General leaps up and stabs the Prince, who gives a last look at Princess Patricia, before dying on her bed.

== Reception ==
Kirkus Reviews states that it is "...a tribute to the sheer exuberance of Aldiss' invention that his considerable freight of thematic baggage doesn't simply collapse under its own weight", calling the book a "...provocative, remarkably successful marriage of breezy jeu d'esprit and historical reflection." C. Ben Ostrander reviewed The Malacia Tapestry in The Space Gamer No. 17, and commented that the novel "is a stylistic and imaginative masterpiece [...] I have no doubt that it is a classic, an example of what can be done with a science fiction novel."

== Reviews ==
- Review by David Wingrove (1976) in Vector 78
- Review by David Pringle (1977) in Foundation, #11 and 12 March 1977
- Review by Jeff Schalles (1978) in Thrust, #11, Fall 1978
- Review by Richard Lupoff (1979) in Starship, Spring 1979
- Review by David Pringle (1988) in Modern Fantasy: The Hundred Best Novels
- Science Fiction Review
