= Neanderthal Planet =

Sci-fi short story collection

First Avon edition cover by Don Ivan Punchatz

Neanderthal Planet is a collection of science fiction short stories written by Brian W. Aldiss and published separately in 1959,1960, 1962, and together in 1969 by special arrangement with the author; it was next published by Avon Books in January, 1970.

== Contents ==
This novel-length book consists of the following four short stories:

- "Neanderthal Planet" (47 pages).
- "Danger: Religion!" (62 pages).
- "Intangibles, Inc." (25 pages). A man bets an agent of Intangibles, Inc., that he won't pick up, move, or remove a salt shaker from his table top. Ever.
- "Since the Assassination" (47 pages).

== See also ==
- List of science fiction novels
