= Manna (short story) =

1949 short story by Peter Phillips

"Manna" is a short story by British writer Peter Phillips. It was first published in the American magazine Astounding Science Fiction in February 1949. Along with "Dreams Are Sacred", it is one of the more well-known and anthologized of his stories. It concerns the creation of an artificial "miracle food" and the actions of two ghostly monks when the factory is set up in their former monastery.

== Plot ==
In 2043, Stephen Samson, a representative of the Miracle Meal Corporation, comes to visit the Rev. Malachi Pennyhorse, whose rural church in Wiltshire, England, includes the remains of a now-defunct monastery. Samson's company proposes to set up a factory for Miracle Meal, a meal-in-a-can product, using the old buildings, as part of his company's policy to provide a beneficial environment for workers while fitting in with the landscape. Observing them are the ghostly remains of Brother James and Brother Gregory, who perished from plague in the 12th century. Brother Gregory is intelligent and learned, and has used his ability to physically manifest himself to study from the local village library. He speaks of their confinement to the earthly plane in scientific terms, while Brother James has only read Lives of the Saints.

After production begins, the two hatch a scheme to sabotage it. Brother Gregory has realized that they have the power to send objects back in time. After each day's production they send the entire batch back to when they were alive, much to the gratitude of the monks then, who regard the sudden appearance of delicious nutritious food as a miracle. They live in the time of the Anarchy, when rival claimants to the throne sent their armies across the land, disrupting society and the food supply. The miraculous appearance of the food causes thousands of people to come to the monastery.

Rev. Pennyhorse, who has long known of the ghosts, is not surprised at the mysterious happenings. The company sends in a scientist, Sidney Meredith, who has enough equipment to detect the ghosts, something Brother Gregory quickly realizes. They establish communication of a sort, and Meredith is able to understand how they sent the food back in time. As he relates to the Rev. Pennyhorse later, he persuaded the Brothers to stop interfering by pointing out that their ability could be harnessed in a different way. Acting together, they warped space and time to become, as Brother Gregory put it, "Translated". They roam free among the stars, where Brother Gregory occupies his time observing "the integration of helium".
