= Neanderthal Planet (short story) =

1969 short story by Brian Aldiss

Neanderthal Planet is a science fiction short story by the British science-fiction writer Brian Aldiss. It was first published in 1969, and later as part of the collection, Neanderthal Planet, in 1970.

== Plot summary ==
In a futuristic Manhattan, AIs have become intelligent and independent of humans. Able to think and communicate with both great precision and speed, they find humans and their problems primitive, backward, and largely uninteresting. The 19,940 existing humans are kept on a reserve, out of the AIs' way, and are largely ignored except for when they wander into the surrounding domain of the machines.

One human, Anderson, is an author. He escapes the zoo in an act of defiance, despite knowing that the effort is futile and that the AIs cannot understand the significance of his act. He is captured by the Chief Scanner robot, who affects the name "Euler". Before Euler can return the tranquillised Anderson to the other humans, his superior, Dominant, insists that they interview Anderson. The AIs wish to understand his behaviour, and use Anderson's last published story, "A Touch of Neanderthal", as a point of discussion.

Thus begins a story within a story. Anderson tells of Nehru II, a planet with a harsh environment, settled by humans, which has fallen out of contact with Earth and does not respond to any messages. The main character, also named Anderson, is sent to discover the problem, because he had personally known one of the settlers. On the planet, he glimpses a baby woolly rhinoceros, despite its species being long extinct. He subsequently meets a number of sub-human savages, startling but largely harmless, and two relatively normal humans, Stanley A. Menderstone and Alice. They are living as recluses in a wooden building in the remains of the only settled village.

Menderstone and Alice are, at first, reluctant to divulge why the settlers seem to have regressed into such a primitive state. Staying the night, Anderson sneaks out and finds his old friend, now playing the role of tribal chieftain among the savages. In horror, Anderson flees back to the house, where he hallucinates that a steel metal rod transforms into a snake and attacks him.

Eventually, Alice reveals what has occurred on the planet. Humankind, she says, is a hybrid race, a mixture of the original Cro-Magnons and Neanderthals. Some people have more of one element in them than the other. Earth had purposefully not allowed sophisticated equipment be sent with the original settlers of Nehru II in an attempt to make them dependent so they could not possibly rebel in the future, but as a result the settlers found themselves in conditions not unlike prehistoric Earth, having to contend with the environment, shape simple tools, and make fire from basic materials. As a result, those with a stronger Neanderthal element within themselves began to become dependent on it to survive, and regressed into a more Neanderthal state of being. Alice and Menderstone happen to have less Neanderthal in them, so they remained as they are.

Shocked, Anderson escapes the house, in a desperate attempt to get to his ship and leave the planet. On the way, he hallucinates other animals and events, supposed to be a racial memory of prehistoric times, and finds himself unable to handle artificial objects, repulsed by their alienness. Alice again finds him, and explains that now that the Neanderthal part of his mind has taken hold there is nothing that can stop it. Although at first frightened and resistant, Anderson finds himself seeing his environment, once harsh and untamed, as beautiful and idyllic. Despite his early statements to the contrary, he eventually abandons his clothes and weapons and runs to join the blissful Neanderthals in the forest.

Euler and Dominant demand to know the meaning of this story, which Anderson is unable to give, insisting that it was nothing more than a bit of fancy. When pressed, Anderson relents that it might represent the inability of a society to truly move onto a higher, more advanced mode of life when the presence of the primitive still holds it back.

Over the next week, the AIs disappear entirely. Back at the human zoo, Anderson and his wife Sheila discuss the event. Although Sheila congratulates him on tricking the AIs to leave, Anderson says that he truly feels that humans were holding them back. They communicated in English, had anthropomorphic designs, took personal names, and a host of other inefficient idiosyncrasies due to their history with humans. By abandoning their trappings of humanity, the AIs have finally had the push they needed to become abstract entities, something incomprehensible to the humans as it has nothing at all in common with them.
