= Isaac Asimov Presents The Great SF Stories 9 (1947) =

1983 science fiction anthology edited by Isaac Asimov and Martin H. Greenberg

- First edition
- Editors: Isaac Asimov; Martin H. Greenberg
- Cover artist: Antonio Bernal
- Language: English
- Series: Isaac Asimov Presents The Great SF Stories
- Genre: Science fiction
- Publisher: DAW Books
- Publication date: February 1983
- Publication place: United States
- Media type: Print (hardback & paperback)
- Preceded by: Isaac Asimov Presents The Great SF Stories 8 (1946)
- Followed by: Isaac Asimov Presents The Great SF Stories 10 (1948)

Isaac Asimov Presents The Great SF Stories 9 (1947) is a science fiction anthology edited by Isaac Asimov and Martin H. Greenberg. It is the ninth volume of Isaac Asimov Presents The Great SF Stories, a series of short story collections, which attempts to list the great science fiction stories from the Golden Age of Science Fiction. They date the Golden Age as beginning in 1939 and lasting until 1963. The book was later reprinted as the first half of Isaac Asimov Presents The Golden Years of Science Fiction, Fifth Series with the second half being Isaac Asimov Presents The Great SF Stories 10 (1948). This volume was originally published by DAW books in February 1983.

== Contents ==
- "Little Lost Robot" by Isaac Asimov
- "Tomorrow's Children" by Poul Anderson
- "Child's Play" by William Tenn
- "Time and Time Again" by H. Beam Piper
- "Tiny and the Monster" by Theodore Sturgeon
- "E for Effort" by T. L. Sherred
- "Letter to Ellen" by Chan Davis
- "The Figure" by Edward Grendon
- "With Folded Hands..." by Jack Williamson
- "The Fires Within" by Arthur C. Clarke
- "Zero Hour" by Ray Bradbury
- "Hobbyist" by Eric Frank Russell
- "Exit the Professor" by Lewis Padgett
- "Thunder and Roses" by Theodore Sturgeon
