= Earthworks =

Earthworks may refer to:

== Construction ==
- Earthworks (archaeology), human-made constructions that modify the land contour
- Earthworks (engineering), civil engineering works created by moving or processing quantities of soil
- Earthworks (military), military fortifications built in the field during a campaign or siege

== Arts and media ==
- Earthworks (novel), a novel by Brian Aldiss
- Earthworks (band), a jazz band led by drummer Bill Bruford
- Earthworks (album), the band's self-titled debut album
- "Earthworks" (song), a 1993 song by Kerbdog
- Land art or Earth art

== Other uses ==
- Earthworks (company), an audio equipment company
- Earthworks High School, an experimental school in Ann Arbor, Michigan
