= The Saliva Tree =

1965 novella by Brian Aldiss

- Cover by Bert Tanner
- Author: Brian Aldiss
- Language: English
- Genre: Science fiction novella
- Published in: The Magazine of Fantasy and Science Fiction
- Publication date: September 1965
- Media type: Magazine
- Award: Nebula Award for Best Novella (1966)

"The Saliva Tree" is a science fiction novella by British writer Brian W. Aldiss first published in the September 1965 issue of The Magazine of Fantasy and Science Fiction. It won the 1965 Nebula Award for Best Novella (which it shared with "He Who Shapes" by Roger Zelazny in a tie).

"The Saliva Tree" was written to mark the centenary of H. G. Wells's birth, and shared the Nebula Award for the best novella of 1965. While set in a Wellsian milieu, it contains two plot elements also found in the stories of H.P. Lovecraft: an object from space which causes crops and livestock to grow prolifically, but be unpalatable (The Colour out of Space) and a monster which is visible only when sprayed with an opaque powder (The Dunwich Horror).
