= Widescreen baroque =

Science fiction subgenre

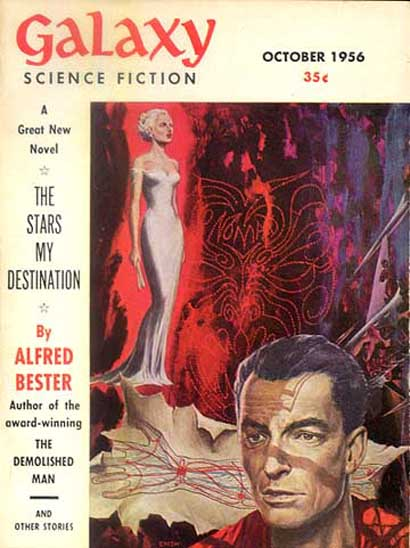
The cover of Galaxy Science Fiction, featuring The Stars My Destination, one of the first widescreen baroque stories.

Widescreen baroque, sometimes stylized with a space or dash in "widescreen", is a style of science fiction writing "characterized by larger-than-life characters, violence, intrigue, extravagant settings or actions, and fast-paced plotting". It is closely aligned with, and an outgrowth of, space opera fiction. The term was coined by Brian Aldiss. It is most often applied by literary critics, rather than authors.

== Definition ==
As characterized by Brian Aldiss in The Billion Year Spree, widescreen baroque entails "a kind of free-wheeling interplanetary adventure, full of brilliant scenery, dramatic scenes, and a joyous taking for granted of the unlikely." According to Paul Di Filippo, "these novels are frequently bildungsromans, sending youthful protagonists out to learn just what they and the universe are made of."

According to Jeff Prucher, they entail "larger-than-life characters, violence, intrigue, extravagant settings or actions, and fast-paced plotting". According to Jerome Winter, "The grandeur of the wide-screen baroque tradition ... seems to evocatively capture inconceivably immense expanses of time and space juxtaposed cheek and jowl with monumental feats of human ingenuity and exuberant future-driven hopes."

Widescreen baroque is characterized by large-scale stories, which often include an adventurous spirit and high energy. The name alludes to the wide screens of film theaters and the perceived extravagance of blockbuster cinema. According to Aldiss, "They like a wide screen, with space and possibly time travel as props, and at least the whole solar system as their setting." The word "baroque" in the name alludes to the ornate style style of Baroque art, which is reflected in widescreen baroque stories.

According to Hirofumi Tanaka, regarding his own idea of widescreen baroque, "You often see reviews of amateur works in beginner’s guides to novel-writing that say things like, 'This is crammed with too many ideas. There are ten ideas packed into this, but if it were me, I could write three stories with this material. Cut those ten ideas down to about three.' Well, I do the exact opposite of that. Instead of a space that’s already full to the brim with 10 ideas, I cram in about 100 ideas, squeezing them tightly together. And I just keep shoving in all sorts of things that seem completely unrelated to one another. That way, even a clumsy shot will eventually hit the mark—they react with each other, go boom, and create a kind of halo effect." However, Tanaka also disagreed with some of the authors that Aldiss labeled as widescreen baroque, saying that writers such as Vogt, Bester, and E. E. Smith don't count to him.

While the term is primarily applied to literature, theatrical works and anime have occasionally been labeled as widescreen baroque as well. David Lynch's Dune, Gurren Lagann, and Revue Starlight: The Movie are among such works.

== History ==
According to the Historical Dictionary of Science Fiction, the term was first used in an introduction Aldiss wrote for Charles L. Harness's 1964 book, The Paradox Men, in which he likened the book and others like it as being "a wide screen, with space and possibly time travel as props, and at least the whole solar system as their setting." He compared the story to those of Alfred Bester or Kurt Vonnegut. The term was brought to greater attention in 1973, when Aldiss references works by E.E. Smith and A.E. van Vogt as wide-screen baroque in his 1973 work The Billion Year Spree.

However, the term remained obscure until the 1990s. Starting then, the term was used in literary criticism by authors such as Paul Di Filippo, Tony Lee, and Iain Banks. It remains most commonly brought up in reference to the critical writings of Aldiss. However, some authors, such as Banks and Mariko Ōhara, have applied the term to their own writing. Gengen Kusano and Hirofumi Tanaka have also described their works as widescreen baroque.

In Japan, widescreen baroque gained popularity in the 1980s. In 1981, The Billion Year Spree was translated into Japanese. It was followed the next year by a translation of Chris Boyce's book, Catchworld, which included a foreword by literary critic Hitoshi Yasuda, discussing widescreen baroque in further detail. Kusano's novel, First and Last Idol, described itself as "widescreen yuri baroque". Kusano also labeled anime such as Puella Magi Madoka Magica as widescreen yuri baroque. Other anime associated with widescreen baroque include Gurren Lagann, Kill la Kill, and Revue Starlight: The Movie. According to Tanaka, widescreen baroque is a term known by many Japanese science fiction fans.

== Authors ==
Authors Aldiss associated with widescreen baroque include:

- E.E. Smith
- A.E. van Vogt
- Charles L. Harness
- Alfred Bester
- Kurt Vonnegut

Authors associated with widescreen baroque by other critics include:

- Barrington Bayley
- Samuel Delany
- Stanislaw Lem
- Alastair Reynolds
- Stephen Baxter
- John C. Wright
- Sakyo Komatsu

Authors who have identified with widescreen baroque include:

- Iain Banks
- Mariko Ōhara
- Hirofumi Tanaka
- Gengen Kusano

== Works ==
Books associated with widescreen baroque include:

- The Stars My Destination
- The Sirens of Titan
- The Paradox Men
- Lensman series
- The Patterns of Chaos
- The World of Null-A
- The Demolished Man
- Xeelee Sequence
- At the End of the Endless Stream
- Iain Bank's Culture series
- Last and First Idol
- Star Maker
- Last and First Men

Film and anime associated with widescreen baroque include:

- Dune (1984)
- Gurren Lagann
- Kill la Kill
- Revue Starlight: The Movie
- Puella Magi Madoka Magica

== Legacy ==
Use of the term remains niche, but several authors have taken to describing their own work this way. Authors who have referred to their own work as widescreen baroque include Iain Banks, Mariko Ōhara and Gengen Kusano.

Widescreen baroque has been referenced in music. This includes Revue Starlight: The Movie, with the song wi(l)d-screen baroque, and an idol unit formed in 2025, called Widescreen Baroque.
