= Cracken at Critical =

Cracken at Critical is a novel by Brian W. Aldiss published in 1987.

== Plot summary ==
Cracken at Critical is a novel in the story "The Mannerheim Symphony" serves as a brief framing narrative enclosed around two short novels, "The Impossible Smile" (1965) and "Equator" (1958).

== Reception ==
Dave Langford reviewed Cracken at Critical for White Dwarf #95, and stated that "Note the careful contrast between 'Cracken's' sloppy wish-fulfilment endings and the bleak loophole which Aldiss-1987 considers the happiest way out."

== Reviews ==
- Review by Gwyneth Jones (1987) in Foundation, #41 Winter 1987, (1987)
- Review by Jon Wallace (1954 -) (1987) in Vector 141 (p 17)
