= Isaac Asimov Presents The Great SF Stories 13 (1951) =

- First edition
- Editors: Isaac Asimov; Martin H. Greenberg
- Cover artist: Cesare Reggiani
- Language: English
- Series: Isaac Asimov Presents The Great SF Stories
- Genre: Science fiction
- Publisher: DAW Books
- Publication date: July 1985
- Publication place: United States
- Media type: Print (hardback & paperback)
- Preceded by: Isaac Asimov Presents The Great SF Stories 12 (1950)
- Followed by: Isaac Asimov Presents The Great SF Stories 14 (1952)

Isaac Asimov Presents The Great SF Stories 13 (1951) is a collection of science fiction short story, edited by Isaac Asimov and Martin H. Greenberg, part of a series that which attempts to list the great science fiction stories from the Golden Age of Science Fiction. They date the Golden Age as beginning in 1939 and lasting until 1963. It was the first book in the series to not be reprinted as part of the Isaac Asimov Presents The Golden Years of Science Fiction series. This volume was originally published by DAW books in July 1985.

== Contents ==
- "Null-P" by William Tenn
- "The Sentinel" by Arthur C. Clarke
- "The Fire Balloons" by Ray Bradbury
- "The Marching Morons" by C. M. Kornbluth
- "The Weapon" by Fredric Brown
- "Angel's Egg" by Edgar Pangborn
- "Breeds There a Man...?" by Isaac Asimov
- "Pictures Don't Lie" by Katherine MacLean
- "Superiority" by Arthur C. Clarke
- "I'm Scared" by Jack Finney
- "The Quest for Saint Aquin" by Anthony Boucher
- "Tiger by the Tail" by Alan E. Nourse
- "With These Hands" by C. M. Kornbluth
- "A Pail of Air" by Fritz Leiber
- "Dune Roller" by Julian May
