= Science Fiction Quiz =

1983 book by Brian Aldiss

Science Fiction Quiz is a book by Brian Aldiss published in 1983. It is a book containing thirty quizzes, each of which asks 8 to 10 questions.

== Reception ==
Dave Langford reviewed Science Fiction Quiz for White Dwarf #51, and stated that "amusing, diverse, good value and sort-of-educational, but hardly major Aldiss."

== Reviews ==
Review by Neil Barron (1984) in SF & Fantasy Review, April 1984
