= No Time Like Tomorrow =

- First edition cover
- Author: Brian Aldiss
- Language: English
- Genre: Science fiction
- Publisher: Signet Books
- Publication date: 1959
- Publication place: United States
- Media type: Print (paperback)
- Pages: 160
- OCLC: 10974649

No Time Like Tomorrow is a collection of science fiction stories, by British writer Brian Aldiss, published in 1959 as an original paperback by Signet Books.

== Contents ==
- "T" (Nebula 1956)
- "Not for an Age" (The London Observer 1955)
- "Poor Little Warrior!" (F&SF 1958)
- "The Failed Men" (Science Fantasy 1956)
- "Carrion Country" (New Worlds 1958)
- "Judas Danced" (Star Science Fiction Magazine 1958)
- "Psyclops" (New Worlds 1956)
- "Outside" (New Worlds 1955)
- "Gesture of Farewell" (New Worlds 1957)
- "The New Father Christmas" (F&SF 1958)
- "Blighted Profile" (Science Fantasy 1958)
- "Our Kind of Knowledge" (New Worlds 1955)

"Judas Danced" was originally published as "Judas Dancing".

== Reception ==
In his review column for F&SF, Damon Knight selected the book as one of the 10 best genre collections of 1959.
