= Earthworks (novel) =

1965 dystopian science fiction novel by Brian Aldiss

- Cover of first edition (hardcover)
- Author: Brian Aldiss
- Language: English
- Genre: Science fiction
- Publisher: Faber & Faber
- Publication date: 1965
- Publication place: United Kingdom
- Media type: Print (Hardcover & Paperback)
- Pages: 155

Earthworks is a 1965 dystopian science fiction novel by British science fiction author Brian Aldiss. The novel draws its premise from prevalent fears about population growth and overcrowding of the Earth.

== Plot introduction ==
The novel is set in a world of environmental catastrophe and extreme socio-economic inequality. Outside crowded cities controlled by a police state, a class of wealthy and powerful "Farmers" exploit a rural prison labour population and hunt down subversive "Travellers" who have broken free of social controls.

== Cultural impact ==
In 1967, the artist Robert Smithson took a copy of Earthworks with him on a trip to the Passaic River in New Jersey (where he created The Monuments of Passaic, 1967). He reused the title to describe some of his works, based on natural materials like earth and rocks, and infused with his ideas about entropy and environmental catastrophe.
