= Supertoys Last All Summer Long =

1969 science fiction short story

- Short story by Brian Aldiss
- Country: United Kingdom
- Language: English
- Genre: Science fiction short story

Publication
- Published in: Harper's Bazaar
- Publisher: Hearst Corporation
- Media type: Print (paperback)
- Publication date: December 1969
- Series: Supertoys

"Supertoys Last All Summer Long" is a science fiction short story by Brian Aldiss, first published in the UK edition of Harper's Bazaar, in its December 1969 issue. The story deals with humanity in an age of intelligent machines and of the aching loneliness endemic in an overpopulated future where child creation is controlled.

The short story was later used as the basis for the first act of the feature film A.I. Artificial Intelligence directed by Steven Spielberg in 2001. In the same year, the short story was republished in the eponymous Aldiss short-story collection Supertoys Last All Summer Long and Other Stories of Future Time, along with the tie-in stories Supertoys When Winter Comes and Supertoys in Other Seasons. Parts of two other Supertoys stories are also reflected in the film. The collection also contained a number of stories not tied to the Supertoys theme.

== Plot ==
In a dystopian future where only a quarter of the world's oversized human population is fed and living comfortably, families must request permission to bear children. Monica Swinton lives with her husband, Henry, and her young son, David, with whom she struggles to bond. She seeks help from Teddy, a robot toy companion of sorts, to try to understand why she feels unable to communicate with David, let alone feel compassion for him. David also questions Teddy about whether his mother truly loves him and wonders whether he is truly real. He attempts to write letters of his own to explain how he feels about his mother and the inner conflict he faces but all of his letters remain unfinished.

Meanwhile, the story jumps to Henry, who is in a meeting with a company he is associated with known as Synthank. They are discussing artificial life forms and bio-electronic beings for future developments. Henry tells them he believes that the new AI under production will finally solve humanity's problems with experiencing personal isolation and loneliness.

Monica discovers David's unfinished letters which express both love and a jealous contempt for Teddy, whom Monica always seemed to connect with more than David himself. Monica is horrified by the letters but overjoyed when Henry arrives home and she is able to share with him that the family has been chosen to give birth to a child by the Ministry of Population. It is then revealed that David is an artificial human, used as a replacement for a real child (of that he is himself unaware; however, he becomes aware of it in the second story, "Supertoys When Winter Comes"). Monica tells Henry that David is having verbal "malfunctioning" problems and must be sent back to the factory again. The story ends with David thinking of the love and warmth of his mother.

== Film adaptation ==
Those three short stories were used as the basis for the feature film A.I. Artificial Intelligence (2001). Stanley Kubrick originally obtained the rights in the 1970s to produce a film adaptation. However, the project was bogged down in "development hell" and was repeatedly postponed. A few years before Kubrick's death in 1999, he suggested to Steven Spielberg that it might be a project better suited for Spielberg to direct. After Kubrick's death, Spielberg ultimately did direct the film, which was released in 2001. Monica Swinton was portrayed by Frances O'Connor, Henry Swinton by Sam Robards, and David Swinton by Haley Joel Osment. The film portrays Teddy as a robotic teddy bear, voiced by Jack Angel.
