= Trillion Year Spree: The History of Science Fiction =

1986 book by Brian W. Aldiss and David Wingrove

- Author: Brian W. Aldiss; David Wingrove
- Language: English
- Subject: History of science fiction
- Genre: Non-fiction
- Publication date: 1986

Trillion Year Spree: The History of Science Fiction, commonly referred to as Trillion Year Spree, is a 1986 book by English writers Brian W. Aldiss and David Wingrove. It is a book-length history of science fiction. The book is an expanded version of Aldiss's 1973 Billion Year Spree: The True History of Science Fiction.

== Reception ==
Wendy Graham reviewed Trillion Year Spree for Adventurer magazine and stated that "This is a text book on SF, which will take you right back to your 'O' and 'A' level days of English Literature. You have to work at reading it, and comprehending, but it will reward anyone who makes the effort. The book closes thusly; 'For SF is in crisis. Where it belongs. This is our prayer for the future: Oh Lord, Make SF perfect - but not quite yet... Exactly."

In a review for White Dwarf, Dave Langford defined it "an essential reference and a good read."

Trillion Year Spree won the Locus Award for Best Non-fiction in 1987.

The first edition, The Billion Year Spree, coined the term widescreen baroque.
