= Brian Aldiss =

British science-fiction writer (1925–2017)

Brian Aldiss OBE
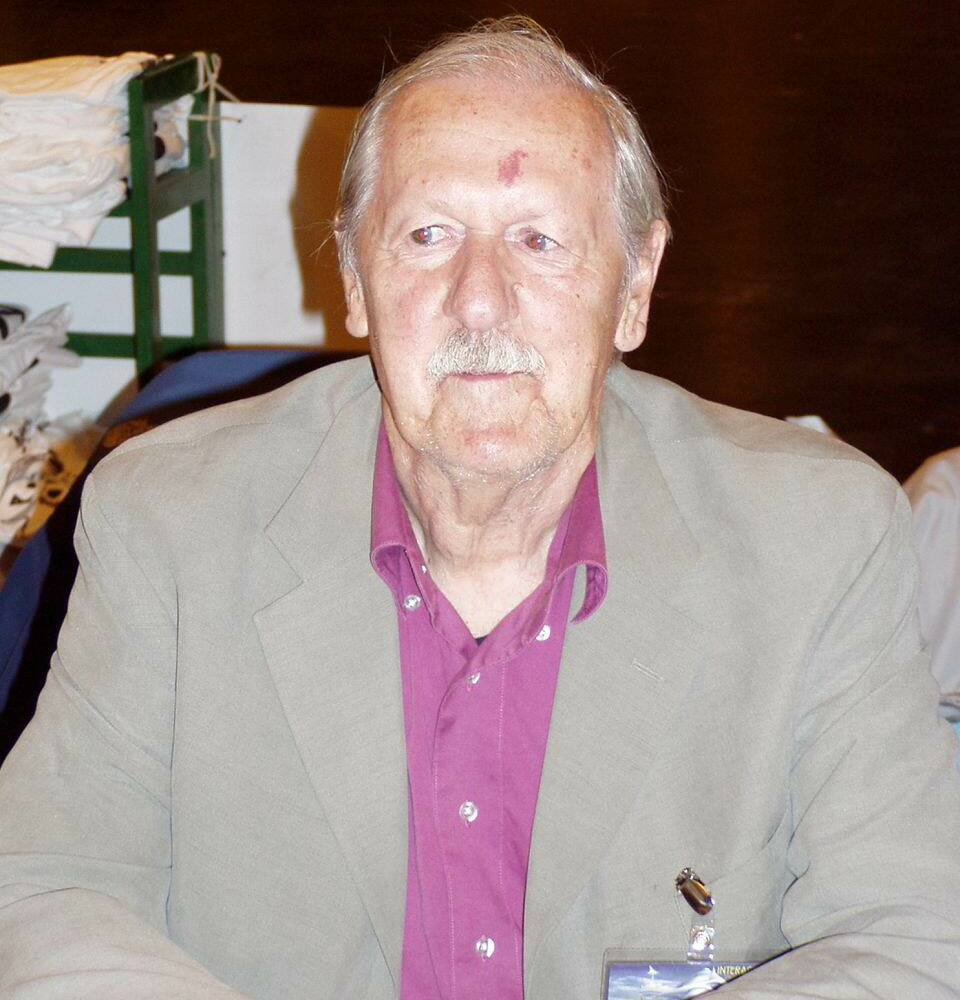
- Aldiss at Interaction in Glasgow, 2005
- Born: Brian Wilson Aldiss; 18 August 1925; East Dereham, Norfolk, England
- Died: 19 August 2017 (aged 92); Oxford, England
- Occupations: Writer; editor; artist
- Writing career
- Pen name: Jael Cracken; Dr. Peristyle; C. C. Shackleton
- Period: 1954–2017
- Genre: Science-fiction
- Notable works: Non-Stop; Hothouse; Helliconia trilogy; "Supertoys Last All Summer Long"
- Website: brianaldiss.co.uk

Brian Wilson Aldiss (/ˈɔːldɪs/; 18 August 1925 – 19 August 2017) was an English writer, artist and anthology editor, best known for science-fiction novels and short stories. His byline reads either Brian W. Aldiss or simply Brian Aldiss, except for occasional pseudonyms during the mid-1960s.

Greatly influenced by science fiction pioneer H. G. Wells, Aldiss was a vice-president of the international H. G. Wells Society. He was co-president of the Birmingham Science Fiction Group with Harry Harrison. Aldiss was named a Grand Master by the Science Fiction Writers of America in 1999 and inducted by the Science Fiction Hall of Fame in 2004. He received two Hugo Awards, one Nebula Award and one John W. Campbell Memorial Award. He wrote the short story "Supertoys Last All Summer Long" (1969), the basis for the Stanley Kubrick-developed Steven Spielberg film A.I. Artificial Intelligence (2001). Aldiss was associated with the British New Wave of science fiction.

== Life and career ==
=== Early life, education and military service ===
Brian Wilson Aldiss was born on 18 August 1925, above his paternal grandfather's draper's shop in Dereham, Norfolk. When Aldiss's grandfather died, his father, Bill (the younger of two sons), sold his share in the shop and the family left Dereham. Aldiss's mother, Dot, was the daughter of a builder. He had an older sister who was stillborn and a younger sister. As a four-year-old, Aldiss started to write stories which his mother would bind and put on a shelf.

At the age of 6, Aldiss went to Framlingham College, but moved to Devon and was sent to board at West Buckland School in 1939 after the outbreak of World War II. As a child, he discovered the pulp magazine Astounding Science Fiction. He eventually read all the novels by H. G. Wells, Robert Heinlein, and Philip K. Dick. In 1943, he joined the Royal Signals and saw military action in Burma.

=== Writing and publishing ===
His army experience inspired the novel Hothouse and the Horatio Stubbs second and third books, A Soldier Erect and A Rude Awakening, respectively.

After the war, he worked as a bookseller in Oxford. He also wrote a number of short pieces for a booksellers' trade journal about life in a fictitious bookshop, which attracted the attention of Charles Monteith, an editor at the publisher Faber and Faber. As a result, Faber and Faber published Aldiss's first book, The Brightfount Diaries (1955), a 200-page novel in diary form about the life of a sales assistant in a bookshop.

About this time, he also began to write science fiction for various magazines. According to ISFDB, his first speculative fiction in print was the short story "Criminal Record", published by John Carnell in the July 1954 issue of Science Fantasy. Several of his stories appeared in 1955, including three in monthly issues of New Worlds, also edited by Carnell.

In 1954, The Observer newspaper ran a competition for a short story set in the year 2500. Aldiss's story "Not For An Age" was ranked third following a reader vote.

The Brightfount Diaries had been a minor success, and Faber asked Aldiss if he had any more writing they could look at with a view to publishing. Aldiss confessed to being a science fiction author, to the delight of the publishers, who had a number of science fiction fans in high places, and so his first science fiction book was published, a collection of short stories entitled Space, Time and Nathaniel (Faber, 1957). By this time, his earnings from writing matched his wages in the bookshop, and he made the decision to become a full-time writer.

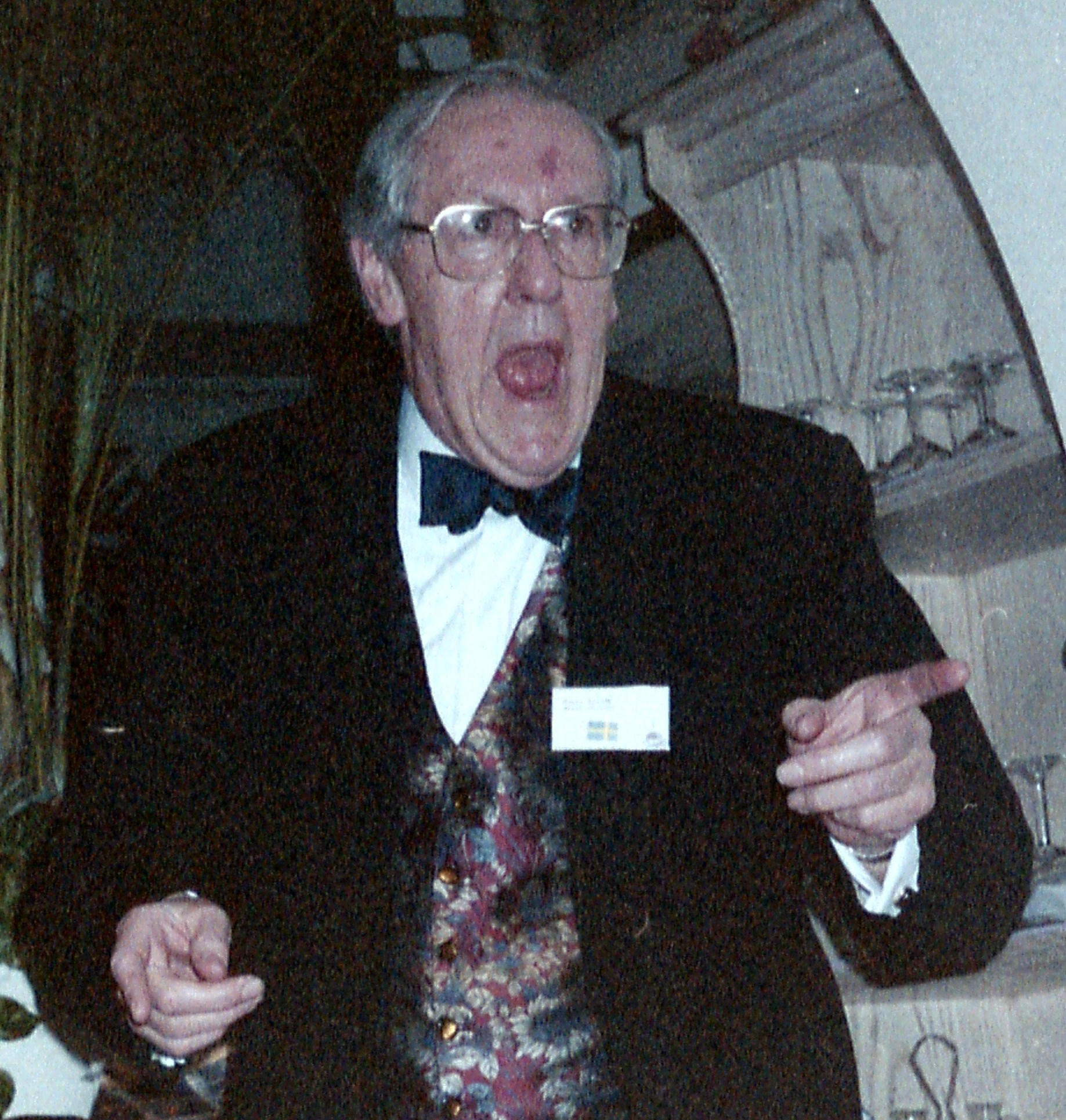
In 2012

Aldiss led the voting for Most Promising New Author of 1958 at the next year's Worldcon, but finished behind "no award". He was elected president of the British Science Fiction Association in 1960. He was the literary editor of the Oxford Mail newspaper from 1958 to 1969. Around 1964, he and long-time collaborator Harry Harrison started the first ever journal of science fiction criticism, Science Fiction Horizons, which during its brief span of two issues published articles and reviews by such authors as James Blish, and featured a discussion among Aldiss, C. S. Lewis, and Kingsley Amis in the first issue and an interview with William S. Burroughs in the second. In 1967, Algis Budrys listed Aldiss, J. G. Ballard, Roger Zelazny and Samuel R. Delany as "an earthshaking new kind of" writers, and leaders of the New Wave. Aldiss supported the New Wave movement, helping the magazine New Worlds to get financial backing from a 1967 Arts Council grant and publishing some of his more experimental work in the magazine.

Besides his own writings, he edited a number of anthologies. For Faber he edited Introducing SF, a collection of stories typifying various themes of science fiction, and Best Fantasy Stories. In 1961, he edited an anthology of reprinted short science fiction for the British paperback publisher Penguin Books under the title Penguin Science Fiction. This was remarkably successful, went into numerous reprints, and was followed up by two further anthologies: More Penguin Science Fiction (1963) and Yet More Penguin Science Fiction (1964). The later anthologies enjoyed the same success as the first, and all three were eventually published together as The Penguin Science Fiction Omnibus (1973), which also went into a number of reprints. In the 1970s, he produced several large collections of classic grand-scale science fiction, under the titles Space Opera (1974), Space Odysseys (1975), Galactic Empires (1976), Evil Earths (1976) and Perilous Planets (1978). Around this time, he edited a large-format volume Science Fiction Art (1975), with selections of artwork from the magazines and pulps.

In response to the results from the planetary probes of the 1960s and 1970s, which showed that Venus was completely unlike the hot, tropical jungle usually depicted in science fiction, Aldiss and Harrison edited an anthology Farewell, Fantastic Venus, reprinting stories based on the pre-probe ideas of Venus. He also edited, with Harrison, a series of anthologies The Year's Best Science Fiction (Nos. 1–9, 1968–1976).

Aldiss invented a form of extremely short story called the mini-saga. The Daily Telegraph hosted a competition for the best mini-saga for several years, and Aldiss was the judge. He edited several anthologies of the best mini-sagas.

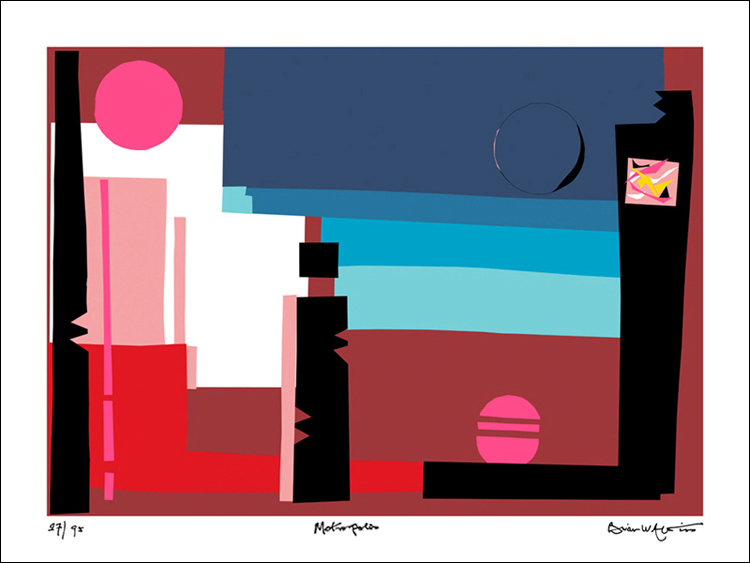
'Metropolis' limited edition print by Brian Aldiss

Aldiss travelled to Yugoslavia, where he met fans in Ljubljana, Slovenia and published a travel book about Yugoslavia entitled Cities and Stones (1966), his only work in the genre. He published an alternative-history fantasy story, "The Day of the Doomed King" (1968), about Serbian kings in the Middle Ages, and wrote a novel called The Malacia Tapestry, about an alternative Dalmatia.

In 1973, Aldiss published Billion Year Spree, a history of the science fiction genre. The book was later republished in 1986, with revisions and contributions from David Wingrove, as Trillion Year Spree. The book coined the term widescreen baroque, which went on to be closely associated with Aldiss in both English and Japanese science fiction fandom.

=== Art ===
In addition to a highly successful career as a writer, Aldiss was an accomplished artist. His first solo exhibition, The Other Hemisphere, was held in Oxford, August–September 2010, and the exhibition's centrepiece Metropolis (see figure) has since been released as a limited edition fine art print. (The exhibition title denotes the writer/artist's notion, "words streaming from one side of his brain inspiring images in what he calls 'the other hemisphere'".)

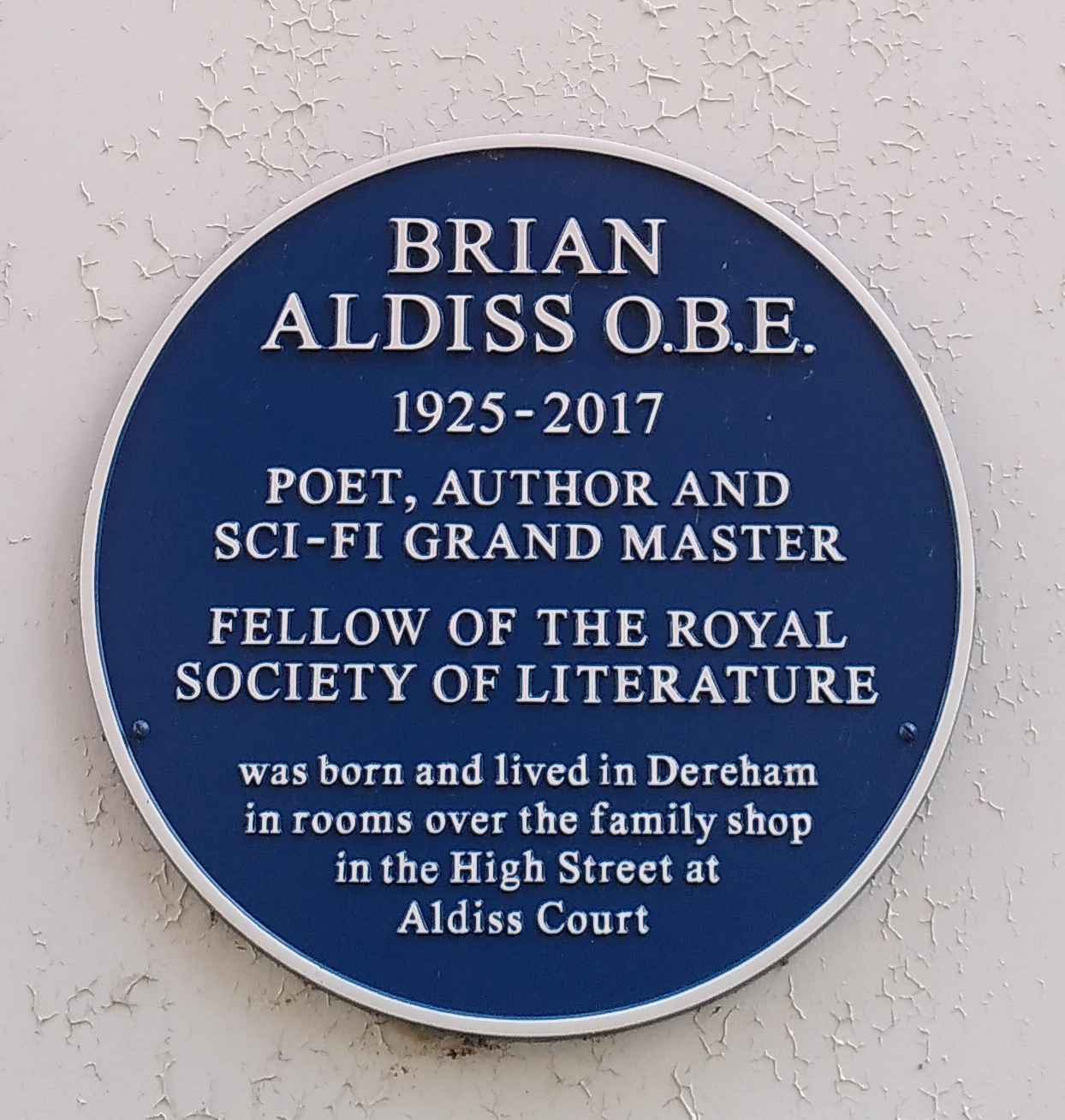
Blue Plaque Dereham

=== Personal life ===
In 1948, Aldiss married Olive Fortescue, secretary to the owner of Sanders' bookseller's in Oxford, where he had worked since 1947. He had two children from his first marriage: Clive in 1955 and Caroline Wendy in 1959, but the marriage "finally collapsed" in 1959 and was dissolved in 1965.

In 1965, he married his second wife, Margaret Christie Manson (daughter of John Alexander Christie Manson, an aeronautical engineer), a Scot and secretary to the editor of the Oxford Mail; Aldiss was 40, and she 31. They lived in Oxford and had two children together, Tim and Charlotte. She died in 1997.

=== Death ===
Aldiss died at his home in Headington, Oxford, on 19 August 2017, the day after his 92nd birthday.

== Awards and honours ==
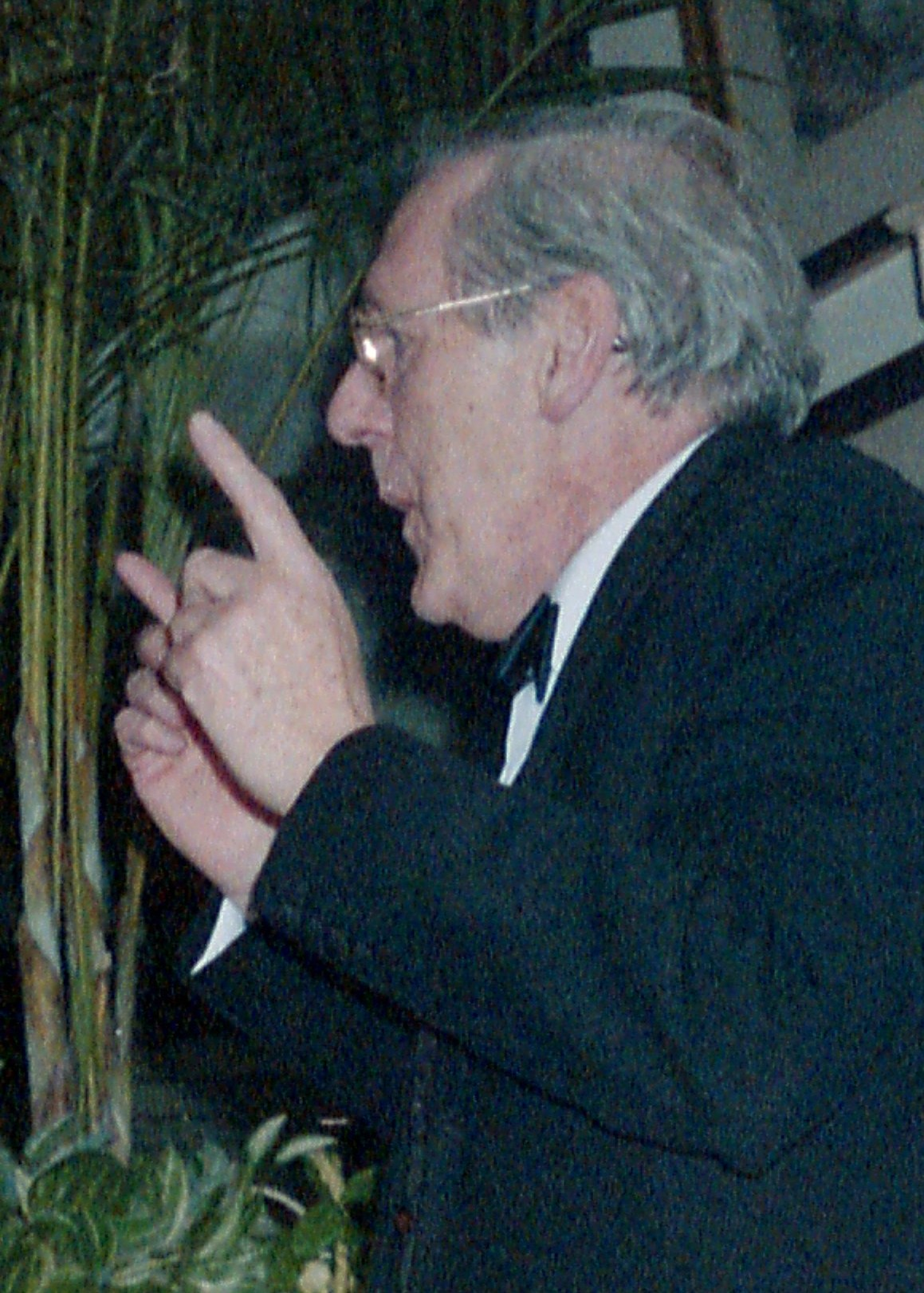
In 2010

He was elected a Fellow of the Royal Society of Literature in 1990.

Aldiss was the "Permanent Special Guest" at the annual International Conference on the Fantastic in the Arts (ICFA) from 1989 through 2008. He was also the Guest of Honor at the conventions in 1986 and 1999.

The Science Fiction Writers of America made him its 18th SFWA Grand Master in 1999 and the Science Fiction and Fantasy Hall of Fame inducted him in 2004.

He was awarded the title of Officer of the Order of the British Empire (OBE) for services to literature in the 2005 Birthday Honours list.

Aldiss appeared twice on Desert Island Discs, first in 1982, when his choice of book was Rasselas by Samuel Johnson and his luxury a time machine. In January 2007 he appeared again: his choice of record to "save" was "Old Rivers" sung by Walter Brennan, his choice of book was John Heilpern's biography of John Osborne, and his luxury a banjo. Full lists of selections for both episodes are on the BBC website.

On 1 July 2008, he was awarded an honorary doctorate by the University of Liverpool in recognition of his contribution to literature. The Brian W Aldiss Archive at the university holds manuscripts from the period 1943–1995.

In 2013, Aldiss received the World Fantasy Convention Award at the World Fantasy Convention in Brighton, England.

Aldiss sat on the Council of the Society of Authors.

He won two Hugo awards: the Hugo Award for Best Short Story in 1962 for the Hothouse series; and the Hugo Award for Best Non-Fiction Book in 1987 for Trillion Year Spree. Aldiss also won the Nebula Award for Best Novella in 1965 for The Saliva Tree.

=== Aldiss Award ===
The inaugural Aldiss Award was presented in 2025, the year which would have marked the author's one hundredth birthday. The award was presented at the World Fantasy Convention. The award is given to a work with outstanding worldbuilding and is intended to honor the author's legacy.

The judging panel is composed of select members of the British Science Fiction Association (BSFA), the British Fantasy Society, and the UK Interactive Entertainment Association.

==== Winners and Nominees ====
Aldiss Award winners and nominees
Year	Nominee	Work	Result	Reference
2025	Rogba Payne	The Dance of Shadows	Won	
2025	Caitlin Rozakis	Dreadful	Shortlisted	
2025	Aman J. Bedi	Kavithri	Shortlisted	
2025	Gabriella Buba	Saints Of Storm and Sorrow	Shortlisted	
2025	Wole Talabi	Shigidi and the Brass Head of Obalufon	Shortlisted	
2025	Veronica Roth	When Among Crows	Shortlisted	
2026	Tasha Suri	The Isle In The Silver Sea	Won	
2026	Morgan Ryan	A Resistance Of Witches	Shortlisted	
2026	Oliver K. Langmead	City Of All Seasons	Shortlisted	
2026	Aliya Whiteley	City Of All Seasons	Shortlisted	
2026	Adrian Tchaikovsky	Shroud	Shortlisted	
2026	Caitlin Rozakis	The Grimoire Grammar School Parent Teacher Association	Shortlisted	

== Works ==
Aldiss was the author of over 80 books and 300 short stories, as well as several volumes of poetry.

=== Novels ===
- The Brightfount Diaries (1955, Faber)
- Non-Stop (1958, Faber), (1959, Digit), (1976, Pan), (2000, Millennium), US title Starship (1960, Signet S1779), (1969, Avon V2321)
  On a massive generation ship whose inhabitants have descended into primitivism over 23 generations, a member of a culturally primordial tribe investigates the dark, jungle-filled corridors of the ship and slowly uncovers the true nature of the universe he inhabits.
- The Interpreter (1960, Digit R506), (1967, Four Square 1970), US title Bow Down to Nul Ace D-443
- The Male Response (1959, Beacon 45), (1961, Four Square 1623)
- The Primal Urge (1961, Ballantine F555), (1967, Sphere), (1976, Panther). A satire on sexual reserve, it explores the effects on society of a forehead-mounted "Emotion Register" that glows when the wearer experiences sexual attraction. The book was banned in Ireland.
- Hothouse (1962, Faber), (1965, Four Square 1147), (1979, Panther), published in abridged form in the American market as The Long Afternoon of Earth (1962, Signet D2018). A fix-up novel based on short stories "Hothouse", "Nomansland", "Undergrowth", "Timberline" and "Evergreen". This assemblage of stories won the Hugo Award for short fiction in 1962.
  Set in a far future Earth, where the earth has stopped rotating, the Sun has increased output, and plants are engaged in a constant frenzy of growth and decay, like a tropical forest enhanced a thousandfold; a few small groups of elvish humans still live on the edge of extinction, beneath the giant banyan tree that covers the day side of the earth.
- Greybeard (1964, Harcourt, Brace & World), (1964, Faber), (1965, Signet P2689), (1968, Panther)
  Set decades after the Earth's population has been sterilised as a result of nuclear bomb tests conducted in Earth's orbit, the book shows an emptying world, occupied by an aging, childless population.
- The Dark Light Years (1964, Signet D2497), (1964, Faber), (1966, Four Square 1437), (1979, Panther)
  The encounter of humans with the utods, gentle aliens whose physical and mental health requires wallowing in mud and filth, and who – though they achieved interstellar space flight – are not even recognised as intelligent by the humans. The critic Fredric Jameson described The Dark Light Years as, along with Ursula K. Le Guin's The Word for World Is Forest, "one of the major SF denunciations of the American genocide in Vietnam."
- Earthworks (1965, Faber), (1966, Doubleday), (1967, Four Square), (1967, Signet P3116), (1979, Panther), (1980, Avon)
- An Age (1967, Faber), (1969, Sphere), (1979, Panther), US title Cryptozoic! (1969, Avon), (1978, Panther), a dystopic time-travel novel
- Report on Probability A (serialized 1967), (1968, Faber), (1969, Sphere). (1969, Doubleday), (1970, Lancer), (1980, Avon)
- Barefoot in the Head (1969, Faber), (1970, Doubleday), (1972, Ace), (1974, Corgi), (1981, AVON), (1990, Gollancz VGSF Classics), a fix-up novel based on short stories: "Just Passing Through", "Multi-Value Motorway", "Still Trajectories", "The Serpent of Kundalini", "Drake-Man Route", and novelettes: "Auto-Ancestral Fracture", "Ouspenski's Astrabahn"
  Perhaps Aldiss's most experimental work, this first appeared in several parts as the Acid Head War series in New Worlds. Set in a Europe some years after a flare-up in the Middle East led to Europe being attacked with bombs releasing huge quantities of long-lived hallucinogenic drugs. Into an England with a population barely maintaining a grip on reality comes a young Serb, who himself starts coming under the influence of the ambient aerosols, and finds himself leading a messianic crusade. The narration and dialogue reflects the shattering of language under the influence of the drugs, in mutating phrases and puns and allusions, in a deliberate echo of Finnegans Wake.
- Horatio Stubbs series:
  1. The Hand-Reared Boy (1970, Weidenfeld & Nicolson), (1971, Signet T4575), (1971, Corgi)
  2. A Soldier Erect (1971, Weidenfeld & Nicolson), (1972, Corgi)
  3. A Rude Awakening (1978, Weidenfeld & Nicolson), (1979, Corgi)
  Omnibus edition, The Horatio Stubbs Saga (1985, Panther)
- Frankenstein Unbound (1973, Jonathan Cape), (1974, Random House), (1975, Fawcett Crest), (1975, Pan)
  A 21st century politician is transported to 19th century Switzerland where he encounters Victor Frankenstein, Frankenstein's monster and Mary Shelley.
- The Eighty Minute Hour, or The 80 minute Hour (1974, Jonathan Cape), (1974, Doubleday), (1975, Leisure), (1975, Pan)
  A weird and ambitious "space opera" whose characters actually sing. The world is in chaos after nuclear war causes time slips and even those that believe they rule the world have trouble knowing where and when they are.
- The Malacia Tapestry (1976, Jonathan Cape), (1977, Harper & Row), (1978, Panther), (1978, Ace), (1985, Berkley)
  A picaresque novel with fantasy elements, set in a city not unlike Venice. However, it is a Venice without Christianity or monotheism, existing within an alternate version of Renaissance or Early Baroque Italy.
- Brothers of the Head (1977, Pierrot), (1979, Panther)
  A large-format book, illustrated by Ian Pollock, tells the strange story of the rock stars Tom and Barry Howe, Siamese twins with a third, dormant head that eventually starts to awaken.
- Enemies of the System (1978, Jonathan Cape), (1978, Harper & Row), (1980, Panther), (1981, Avon)
- Moreau's Other Island (1980, Jonathan Cape), (1982, Panther), or An Island Called Moreau (1981, Simon & Schuster), (1981, Timescape)
- Squire Quartet series:
  1. Life in the West (1980, Weidenfeld & Nicolson), (1982, Corgi)
  2. Forgotten Life (1988, Gollancz), (1989, Atheneum / Macmillan), (1989, Mandarin)
  3. Remembrance Day (1993, HarperCollins UK), (1993, St. Martin's Press), (1994, Flamingo)
  4. Somewhere East of Life (1994, Carroll & Graf), (1994, Flamingo)
- Helliconia Trilogy
  1. Helliconia Spring (1982, Atheneum), (1982, Jonathan Cape), (1983, Berkley), (1983, Granada)
    BSFA Award; Campbell Memorial Award; Nebula Award finalist
  2. Helliconia Summer (1983, Atheneum), (1983, Jonathan Cape), (1984, Berkley), (1985, Granada)
    BSFA finalist; Locus Award, fourth place
  3. Helliconia Winter (1985, Atheneum), (1985, Jonathan Cape), (1986, Berkley), (1986, Granada)
    BSFA; Nebula finalist; Locus, fifth place
  Omnibus edition, Helliconia (2010, Gollancz SF Masterworks)
- Ruins (1987), novella
- The Year Before Yesterday, or Cracken at Critical (1987, Franklin Watts), (1987, Kerosina), (1988, St. Martin's), (1989, New English Library), a fix-up novel based on novelette "Equator" and novella "The Impossible Smile"
- Dracula Unbound (1990, HarperCollins), (1991, Graftton)
- White Mars or, the Mind Set Free (1999, Little, Brown UK), (2000, St. Martin's), with Roger Penrose OCLC 905903045
- Super-State (2002, Orbit)
- The Cretan Teat (2002)
- Affairs at Hampden Ferrers (2004)
- Sanity and the Lady (2005, PS Publishing)
- Jocasta (2006, Rose Press)
  A re-telling of Sophocles's Theban tragedies concerning Oedipus and Antigone. In Aldiss's novel, myth and magic are vibrantly real, experienced through an evolving human consciousness. Amidst various competing interpretations of reality, including the appearance of a time-travelling Sophocles, Aldiss provides an alternative explanation of the Sphinx's riddle.
- HARM (2007, del Rey), (2007, Duckworth)
  Campbell Award nominee
- Walcot (2010, Goldmark)
  Family saga spanning the 20th century
- Finches of Mars (2012)
- Comfort Zone (2013)

=== Short stories ===
Collections:

- Space, Time and Nathaniel (1957, Faber), (1966, Four Square 1496), (1979, Panther), collection of 14 short stories:
  "T", "Our Kind of Knowledge", "Psyclops", "Conviction", "Not for an Age", "The Shubshub Race", "Criminal Record", "The Failed Men", "Supercity", "There Is a Tide", "Pogsmith", "Outside", "Panel Game", "Dumb Show"
- The Canopy of Time (1959, Faber), (1963, Four Square 821), collection of 10 short stories and 1 novelette:
  "Three's a Cloud", "All the World's Tears", "Who Can Replace a Man?", "Blighted Profile", "Judas Danced", "O, Ishrail!", "Incentive", "Gene-Hive", "Secret of a Mighty City", "They Shall Inherit", "Visiting Amoeba" (novelette)
  The US title Galaxies Like Grains of Sand (1960, Signet S1815), (1979 Panther), was a different version, which Aldiss preferred.
- No Time Like Tomorrow (1959, Signet S1683), collection of 11 short stories and 1 novelette:
  "T", "Not for an Age", "Poor Little Warrior!", "The Failed Men", "Carrion Country", "Judas Danced", "Psyclops", "Outside", "Gesture of Farewell" (novelette), "The New Father Christmas", "Blighted Profile", "Our Kind of Knowledge"
- Equator, or Equator and Segregation (1963), collection of 2 novellas/novelettes:
  "Equator" (novella), "Segregation, AKA The Game of God" (novelette)
- The Airs of Earth (1963, Faber), (1965, Four Square 1325), collection of 4 short stories and 4 novelettes:
  "A Kind of Artistry" (novelette), "How to Be a Soldier", "Basis for Negotiation" (novelette), "Shards", "O Moon of My Delight!" (novelette), "The International Smile", "The Game of God" (novelette), "Old Hundredth"
- Starswarm (1963, Signet D2411), collection of 4 short stories and 4 novelettes:
  "Sector Vermilion: A Kind of Artistry" (novelette), "Sector Gray: Hearts and Engines", "Sector Violet: The Underprivileged", "Sector Diamond: The Game of God" (novelette), "Sector Green: Shards", "Sector Yellow: Legends of Smith's Burst" (novelette), "Sector Azure: O Moon of My Delight!" (novelette), "The Rift: Old Hundredth"
- Best SF stories of Brian Aldiss (1965, Faber); US title Who Can Replace a Man? (1965, Harcourt, Brace & World), (1967, Signet P3311), collection of 11 short stories and 3 novelettes:
  "Who Can Replace a Man?", "Not for an Age", "Psyclops", "Outside", "Dumb Show", "The New Father Christmas", "Ahead", "Poor Little Warrior!", "Man on Bridge", "The Impossible Star" (novelette), "Basis for Negotiation" (novelette), "Old Hundredth", "A Kind of Artistry" (novelette), "Man in His Time"
- The Saliva Tree and Other Strange Growths (1966, Faber), (1968, Sphere), collection of 7 short stories and 3 novellas/novelettes:
  "The Saliva Tree" (novella), "Danger: Religion!" (novella), "The Source", "The Lonely Habit", "A Pleasure Shared", "One Role with Relish", "Legends of Smith's Burst" (novelette), "The Day of the Doomed King", "Paternal Care", "Girl and Robot with Flowers"
  Title story "The Saliva Tree" was written to mark the centenary of H. G. Wells's birth, and shared the Nebula Award for the best novella of 1964. While set in a Wellsian milieu, it contains two plot elements also found in the stories of H. P. Lovecraft: an object from space which causes crops and livestock to grow prolifically, but be unpalatable (The Colour out of Space); and a monster which is visible only when sprayed with an opaque powder (The Dunwich Horror).
- Intangibles Inc. and Other Stories (1969, Faber), (1971, Corgi), collection of 5 novellas/novelettes:
  "Neanderthal Planet" (novelette), "Randy's Syndrome" (novelette), "Send Her Victorious or the War Against the Victorians, 2000 A.D." (novelette), "Intangibles, Inc." (novelette), "Since the Assassination" (novella)
- The Moment of Eclipse (1970, Faber), (1972, Doubleday), (1973, Panther), collection of 12 short stories and 2 novelettes:
  "The Moment of Eclipse", "The Day We Embarked for Cythera...", "Orgy of the Living and the Dying" (novelette), "Supertoys Last All Summer Long", "The Village Swindler", "Down the Up Escalation", "That Uncomfortable Pause Between Life and Art", "Confluence", "Heresies of the Huge God", Clement Yale series (#1 "The Circulation of the Blood" (novelette), #2 "...And the Stagnation of the Heart"), "The Worm That Flies", "Working in the Spaceship Yards", "Swastika!"
  British Science Fiction Association (BSFA) Award
- Neanderthal Planet (1970, Avon), collection of 4 novellas/novelettes:
  "Neanderthal Planet" (novelette), "Danger: Religion!" (novella), "Intangibles, Inc." (novelette), "Since the Assassination" (novelette)
- Best Science Fiction Stories of Brian W. Aldiss (1971), collection of 14 short stories and 2 novelettes:
  "Who Can Replace a Man?", "Not for an Age", "Outside", "Poor Little Warrior!", "Man on Bridge", "The Impossible Star" (novelette), "Old Hundredth", "Man in His Time", "Shards", "Girl and Robot with Flowers", "The Moment of Eclipse", "Swastika!", "Sober Noises of Morning in a Marginal Land" (novelette), "Judas Danced", "Still Trajectories", "Another Little Boy"
- The Book of Brian Aldiss (1972, DAW 29), UK title The Comic Inferno (1973, New English Library), collection of 5 short stories and 4 novelettes:
  "Comic Inferno" (novelette), "The Underprivileged", "Cardiac Arrest" (novelette), "In the Arena", "All the World's Tears", "Amen and Out", "The Soft Predicament" (novelette), "As for Our Fatal Continuity...", "Send Her Victorious" (novelette)
- Last Orders and Other Stories (1977, Jonathan Cape), (1979, Panther), collection of 23 short stories and 1 novelette:
  "Last Orders", "Creatures of Apogee", Enigma series, Three Deadly Enigmas: V: Year by Year the Evil Gains (#1 "Within the Black Circle", #2 "Killing Off the Big Animals", #3 "What Are You Doing? Why Are You Doing It?"), Enigma series, Diagrams For Three (Enigmatic) Stories (#1 "The Girl in the Tau-Dream", #2 "The Immobility Crew", #3 "A Cultural Side-Effect"), "Live? Our Computers Will Do That for Us", "The Monsters of Ingratitude IV", Enigma series, The Aperture Moment (#1 "Waiting for the Universe to Begin", #2 "But Without Orifices", #3 "Aimez-Vous Holman Hunt?"), "Backwater", Enigma series, Three Enigmas II: The Eternal Theme Of Exile (#1 "The Eternal Theme of Exile", #2 "All Those Enduring Old Charms", #3 "Nobody Spoke Or Waved Goodbye"), "The Expensive Delicate Ship", Enigma series, Three Enigmas IV: Three Coins in [Enigmatic|Clockwork] Fountain (#1 "Carefully Observed Women", #2 "The Daffodil Returns the Smile", #3 "The Year of the Quiet Computer"), "Appearance of Life", "Wired for Sound", "Journey to the Heartland" (novelette)
- Galaxies Like Grains of Sand (1979, Panther), collection of 9 short stories:
  "The War Millennia", "The Sterile Millennia", "The Robot Millennia", "The Mingled Millennia", "The Dark Millennia", "The Star Millennia", "The Mutant Millennia", "The Megalopolis Millennia", "The Ultimate Millennia"
- Brothers of the Head and Where the Lines Converge (1979), collection of 1 novel, 1 novelette and 6 poems:
  Brothers of the Head (novel), "Big Lover" (poem), "Love Is a Forest" (poem), "Bacterial Action" (poem), "Star-Time" (poem), "Just for a Moment" (poem), "I Was Never Deaf or Blind to Her Music" (poem), "Where The Lines Converge" (novelette)
- New Arrivals, Old Encounters (1979, Jonathan Cape), (1980, Harper & Row), (1981, Avon), collection of 9 short stories and 3 novelettes:
  "New Arrivals, Old Encounters", "The Small Stones of Tu Fu", "Three Ways" (novelette), "Amen and Out", "A Spot of Konfrontation", "The Soft Predicament" (novelette), "Non-Isotropic", "One Blink of the Moon", "Space for Reflection", "Song of the Silencer", "Indifference" (novelette), "The Impossible Puppet Show"
- Foreign Bodies (1981), collection of 5 short stories and 1 novelette:
  "A Romance of the Equator", "Boat Animals", "Foreign Bodies", "Frontiers", "The Skeleton", "Just Back From Java" (novelette)
- Bestsellers Vol. 3 No. 9: Best of Aldiss (1983), collection of 10 short stories and 2 novelettes:
  "Oh, For a Closer Brush with God", "Appearance of Life", "The Small Stones of Tu Fu", "The Game with the Big Heavy Ball", "A Romance of the Equator", Enigma series, Three Revolutionary Enigmas (#1 "The Fall of Species B", #2 "In the Halls of the Hereafter", #3 "The Ancestral Home of Thought"), "The Blue Background", "A Private Whale" (novelette), "Consolations of Age", "The Girl Who Sang" (novelette)
- Seasons in Flight (1984, Jonathan Cape), (1986, Atheneum), (1986, Grafton), (1988, Ace), collection of 8 short stories (10 in 1986) and 1 novelette:
  "The Gods in Flight", "A Romance of the Equator", "The Blue Background", "The Girl Who Sang" (novelette), "Igur and the Mountain", "The O in José", "The Other Side of the Lake", "The Plain, the Endless Plain", "Incident in a Far Country"
  Added in 1986: "Consolations of Age", "Juniper"
- Science Fiction Blues Programme Book (1987), collection of 3 short stories and 2 poems:
  "Traveller, Traveller, Seek Your Wife in the Forests of This Life", "The Ascent of Humbelstein", "At the Caligula Hotel" (poem), "'Rhine Locks are Closed in Battle Against Poison'" (poem), "Those Shouting Nights"
- The Magic of the Past (1987), collection of 2 short stories:
  "North Scarning", "The Magic of the Past"
- Best SF Stories of Brian W. Aldiss (1988), collection of 18 short stories and 3 novellas/novelettes:
  "Outside", "All the World's Tears", "Poor Little Warrior!", "Who Can Replace a Man?", "Man on Bridge", "The Girl and the Robot with Flowers", "The Saliva Tree" (novella), "Man in His Time", "Heresies of the Huge God", "Confluence", "Working in the Spaceship Yards", The Supertoys Trilogy (#1 "Supertoys Last All Summer Long"), "Sober Noises of Morning in a Marginal Land" (novelette), "The Dark Soul of the Night", "Appearance of Life", "Last Orders", "Door Slams in Fourth World", "The Gods in Flight", "My Country 'Tis Not Only of Thee" (novelette), "Infestation", "The Difficulties Involved in Photographing Nix Olympica"
- Best SF Stories (1988), collection of 18 short stories and 3 novellas/novelettes:
  "Outside", "The Failed Men", "Poor Little Warrior!", "Who Can Replace a Man?", "Man on Bridge", "Girl and Robot with Flowers", "The Saliva Tree" (novella), "Man in His Time", "Heresies of the Huge God", "Confluence", "Working in the Spaceship Yards", The Supertoys Trilogy (#1 "Supertoys Last All Summer Long"), "Sober Noises of Morning in a Marginal Land" (novelette), "The Dark Soul of the Night", "Appearance of Life", "Last Orders", "Door Slams in Fourth World", "The Gods in Flight", "My Country 'Tis Not Only of Thee" (novelette), "Infestation", "The Difficulties Involved in Photographing Nix Olympica"
- Man in His Time: The Best Science Fiction Stories of Brian W. Aldiss (1988, Atheneum) ISBN 0-689-12052-4, (1990, Collier), collection of 19 short stories and 3 novellas/novelettes:
  "Outside", "The Failed Men", "All the World's Tears", "Poor Little Warrior!", "Who Can Replace a Man?", "Man on Bridge", "The Girl and the Robot with Flowers", "The Saliva Tree" (novella), "Man in His Time", "Heresies of the Huge God", "Confluence", "Working in the Spaceship Yards", The Supertoys Trilogy (#1 "Supertoys Last All Summer Long"), "Sober Noises of Morning in a Marginal Land" (novelette), "The Dark Soul of the Night", "Appearance of Life", "Last Orders", "Door Slams in Fourth World", "The Gods in Flight", "My Country 'Tis Not Only of Thee" (novelette), "Infestation", "The Difficulties Involved in Photographing Nix Olympica"
- Science Fiction Blues (1988), collection of 3 short stories, 15 poems and 11 plays:
  "Science Fiction Blues (play)" (play), "Supertoys Last All Summer Long (play)" (play), "The Death of Art? (play)" (play), "The Expensive Delicate Ship (play)" (play), "Don't Go To Jupiter" (poem), "Star-Time" (poem), "The Cat Improvement Company" (poem), "Progression of the Species" (poem), "Juniper (play)" (play), "Conversation on Progress (play)" (play), "Drinks with the Spider King (play)" (play), "Three Serials (play)" (play), "Last Orders (play)" (play), "Bill Carter Takes Over (play)" (play), "Talking Heads (play)" (play), "Traveller, Traveller, Seek Your Wife in the Forests of This Life", "The Ascent of Humbelstein", "Those Shouting Nights", "The Lying Truth" (poem), "Destruction of the Fifth Planet" (poem), "The Expanding Universe" (poem), "Bacterial Action" (poem), "To a Triceratops Skull in the British Museum" (poem), "Femalien" (poem), "Space Burial" (poem), "Taking Leave of a Northern Institution" (poem), "Thomas Hardy Considers the Newly-Published Special Theory of Relativity" (poem), "Parting Late in Life" (poem), "Happiness and Suffering" (poem)
- A romance of the Equator. Best Fantasy Stories (1989, Gollancz), (1990, Atheneum / Macmillan) ISBN 0-689-12053-2, collection of 22 short stories and 4 novelettes:
  "Old Hundredth", "Day of the Doomed King", "The Source", "The Village Swindler", "The Worm That Flies", "The Moment of Eclips", "So Far from Prague", "The Day We Embarked for Cythera", "Castle Scene with Penitents", "The Game with the Big Heavy Ball", "Creatures of Apogee", "The Small Stones of Tu Fu", "Just Back From Java" (novelette), "A Romance of the Equator", "Journey to the Goat Star" (novelette), "The Girl Who Sang" (novelette), "Consolations of Age", "The Blue Background", "The Plain, the Endless Plain", "You Never Asked My Name", "Lies!" (novelette), "North Scarning", "The Big Question", "The Ascent of Humbelstein", "How an Inner Door Opened to My Heart", "Bill Carter Takes Over"
- Bodily Functions (1991), collection of 2 short stories, 2 novelettes, 2 poems and 1 essay:
  "To Sam" (poem), "Three Degrees Over" (novelette), "A Tupolev Too Far" (novelette), "Going for a Pee", "Better Morphosis", "Letter on the subject of Bowel Movement" (essay), "Envoi" (poem)
- A Tupolev Too Far and Other Stories (1993, HarperCollins UK), (1994, St. Martin's), collection of 6 short stories, 5 novelettes and 2 poems:
  "Short Stories" (poem), "A Tupolev Too Far" (novelette), "Ratbird", "FOAM" (novelette), "Summertime Was Nearly Over", "Better Morphosis", "Three Degrees Over" (novelette), "A Life of Matter and Death" (novelette), "A Day in the Life of a Galactic Empire", "Confluence", "Confluence Revisited", "North of the Abyss" (novelette), "Alphabet of Ameliorating Hope" (poem)
- The Secret of This Book (1995, HarperCollins UK), US title Common Clay: 20-Odd Stories (1996, St. Martin's), collection of 20 short stories and 3 novelettes:
  "Common Clay", "The Mistakes, Miseries and Misfortunes of Mankind", "How the Gates Opened and Closed", "Headless", "Travelling Towards Humbris", "If Hamlet's Uncle Had Been a Nicer Guy", "Else the Isle with Calibans", "A Swedish Birthday Present", Enigma series, Three Moon Enigmas (#1 "His Seventieth Heaven", #2 "Rose in the Evening", #3 "On the Inland Sea"), "A Dream of Antigone", "The God Who Slept With Women" (novelette), "Evans in His Moment of Glory", "Horse Meat" (novelette), "An Unwritten Love Note", "Making My Father Read Revered Writings", "Sitting With Sick Wasps", "Becoming the Full Butterfly" (novelette), "Traveller, Traveller, Seek Your Wife in the Forests of This Life", Enigma series, Her Toes Were Beautiful on the [Hilltops|Mountains] (#1 "Another Way Than Death", #2 "That Particular Green of Obsequies"), Enigma series, Three Revolutionary Enigmas (#3 "The Ancestral Home of Thought")
- Supertoys Last All Summer Long and Other Stories of Future Time (2001, Orbit), (2001, St. Martin's), collection of 18 short stories and 1 novelette:
  The Supertoys Trilogy (#1 "Supertoys Last All Summer Long", #2 "Supertoys When Winter Comes", #3 "Supertoys in Other Seasons"), "Apogee Again", "III", "The Old Mythyology", "Headless", "Beef", "Nothing in Life Is Ever Enough", "A Matter of Mathematics", "The Pause Button", "Three Types of Solitude", "Steppenpferd", "Cognitive Ability and the Light Bulb", "Dark Society", "Galaxy Zee", "Marvells of Utopia", "Becoming the Full Butterfly" (novelette), "A Whiter Mars: A Socratic Dialogue of Times to Come"
- Cultural Breaks (2005, Tachyon Publications), collection of 9 short stories and 3 novellas/novelettes:
  "Tarzan of the Alps", "Tralee of Man Young", "The Eye Opener", "Aboard the Beatitude" (novelette), "The Man and a Man with His Mule", "Dusk Flight", "Commander Calex Killed, Fire and Fury at the Edge of World, Scones Perfect", "The Hibernators", "The National Heritage", "How the Gates Opened and Closed", "Total Environment" (novelette), "A Chinese Perspective" (novella)
- A Prehistory of Mind (2008, Mayapple Press), collection of
  55 poems in three sections:
  - Far Away: "The Deceptive Truth", "Flight 063", "Breugel's Hunters in the Snow", "Tien Shan", "The Kremlin, Moscow, ca. 1950", "Of All the Places", "The Moment", "Winter", "Journeying", "Rapide des morts", "The Cynar, Istanbul", "Exmoor in September", "On Passing a Roadside Auction of Featherbeds", "April in East Coker", "Gaughin's Tahiti", "Monemvasia"
  - Affection: "The Heavy Cup", "Spinal Metaphors", "Comfort Me, Sweetheart", "Get Out of My Life", "Being a Little Well", "This Brown Leaf", "Leaving Our Common Bed", "Rest Your Weary Head Upon Your Pillow", "The Empty Boxes", "Greed", "The First of March 1998", "Margaret's Questions", "Song: In Bed She Like a Lily Lay", "Jocasta", "Lu Tai", "Rondeau After Leigh Hunt", "A Piece of Cleopatra", "Aral Seasons", "At the Caligula Hotel"
  - Observation: "The Prehistory of the Mind", "Volcano", "Perspectives", "The Cat Improvement Company", "Winter Bites Deep", "The Bonfire of Time", "Iceberg Music", "The Bellowings", "Jackie", "The Bare Facts", "Nocturne", "An Interval", "Fairy Tales", "The Foot Speaks", "The Women", "Bosom Friends", "Colour Contrasts", "Uzbecks in London", "Antigone's Song", "A. E. van Vogt"
  1 short story: "Mortistan"
- The Invention of Happiness (2013), collection of 33 short stories:
  "The Invention of Happiness", "Beyond Plato's Cave", "Old Mother", "Belief", "After the Party", "Our Moment of Appearance", "The Bone Show", "The Great Plains", "What Befell the Tadpole", "The Sand Castle", "The Village of Stillthorpe", "Peace and War", "The Vintage Cottage", "Moderns on Ancient Ancestors", "The Hungers of an Old Language", "How High is a Cathedral?", "A Middle Class Dinner", "Flying Singapore Airlines", "The Apology", "Camões", "The Question of Atmosphere", "Illusions of Reality", "Lady with Apple Trees", "Flying and Bombing", "Molly Smiles Forever", "Days Gone By", "The Last of the Hound-Folk", "Munch", "The Music of Sound", "The Silent Cosmos", "Writings on the Rock", "The Light Really", "The Mistake They Made"
- Hello Earth, Are You There? The Best SF Stories of Brian Aldiss (2025), collection of 26 short stories:

Not for an Age, Supertoys Last All Summer Long, Conviction, All the World's Tears, "Intangibles, Inc.", Breathing Space, "Softly — As in an Evening Sunrise", In the Arena, Working in the Spaceship Yards, "As for Our Fatal Continuity ...", Psyclops, Never Let Go of My Hand!, You Never Asked My Name, Juniper, Confluence, The Under-Privileged, Something from the Turkish, "Poor Little Warrior!", How the Gates Opened and Closed, The Worm that Flies, A Tupolev Too Far, A Romance of the Equator, Short Stories, "A New (Governmental) Father Christmas", Last Orders, Bill Carter Takes Over

- The Brian Aldiss Collection:
  1. The Complete Short Stories: The 1950s (2013), collection of 57 short stories and 8 novellas/novelettes:
    "A Book in Time", "Criminal Record", "Breathing Space", "The Great Time Hiccup", "Not for an Age", "Our Kind of Knowledge", "Outside", "Panel Game", "Pogsmith", "Conviction", "Dumb Show", "The Failed Men", "Non-Stop" (novelette), "Psyclops", "T", "There Is a Tide", "Tradesman's Exit", "With Esmond in Mind", "The Flowers of the Forest", "Gesture of Farewell" (novelette), "The Ice Mass Cometh", "Let's Be Frank", "No Gimmick", "The War Millennia", "Out of Reach", "The Sterile Millennia", "All the World's Tears", "The Dark Millennia", "O Ishrail!", "The Ultimate Millennia", "Visiting Amoeba" (novelette), "The Shubshub Race", "Supercity", "Judas Danced", "Ten-Storey Jigsaw", "The Pit My Parish" (novelette), "Blighted Profile", "Who Can Replace a Man?", "The Carp That Once ...", "Carrion Country", "Equator" (novella), "Fourth Factor" (novelette), "The Megalopolis Millennia", "Secret of a Mighty City", "The Star Millennia", "Incentive", "The Mutant Millennia", "Gene-Hive", "The New Father Christmas", "Ninian's Experiences", "Poor Little Warrior!", "Sector Diamond", "Sight of a Silhouette", "They Shall Inherit", "Are You an Android?", "The Arm", "The Bomb-Proof Bomb", "Fortune's Fool", "Intangibles, Inc." (novelette), "Sector Yellow", "The Lieutenant", "The Other One" (novelette), "Safety Valve", "The Towers of San Ampa", "Three's a Cloud"
  2. The Complete Short Stories: The 1960s (Part 1) (2015), collection of 11 short stories and 6 novellas/novelettes:
    "Faceless Card", "Neanderthal Planet" (novelette), "Old Hundredth", "Original Sinner", "Sector Grey", "Stage-Struck!", "Under an English Heaven", "Hen's Eyes", "Sector Azure" (novelette), "A Pleasure Shared", "Basis for Negotiation" (novelette), "Conversation Piece", "Danger: Religion!" (novella), "The Green Leaves of Space", "Sector Green", "Sector Vermilion" (novelette), "Tyrants' Territory" (novelette)
  3. The Complete Short Stories: The 1960s (Part 2) (2015), collection of 10 short stories and 6 novellas/novelettes:
    "Comic Inferno" (novelette), "The Impossible Star" (novelette), "In the Arena", "The International Smile", "Sector Violet", "Skeleton Crew" (novella), "The Thing Under the Glacier", "Counter-Feat", "Jungle Substitute" (novelette), "Lazarus", "Man on Bridge", "'Never Let Go of My Hand!'", "No Moon To-night!" (novelette), "One-Way Strait", "Pink Plastic Gods", "Unauthorised Persons" (novelette)
  4. The Complete Short Stories: The 1960s (Part 3) (2015), collection of 18 short stories, 3 novellas/novelettes and 1 essay:
    "The Day of the Doomed King", "The Girl and the Robot with Flowers", "'How are they All on Deneb IV?'" (essay), "The Impossible Smile" (novelette), "Man in His Time", "Old Time's Sake", "The Saliva Tree" (novella), "Scarfe's World", "The Small Betraying Detail", "The Source", "Amen and Out", "Another Little Boy", "Burning Question", Clement Yale series (#1 "The Circulation of the Blood" (novelette)), "The Eyes of the Blind King", "Heresies of the Huge God", "Lambeth Blossom", "The Lonely Habit", "The O in José", "One Role with Relish", "Paternal Care", "The Plot Sickens"
  5. The Complete Short Stories: The 1960s (Part 4) (2015), collection of 28 short stories, 7 novellas/novelettes and 1 essay:
    "A Difficult Age", "A Taste for Dostoevsky", "Auto-Ancestral Fracture" (novelette), "Confluence", "The Dead Immortal", "Down the Up Escalation", "Full Sun", "Just Passing Through", "Multi-Value Motorway", "The Night That All Time Broke Out", "Randy's Syndrome" (novelette), "Still Trajectories", "Two Modern Myths: Reflection on Mars and Ultimate Construction", "Wonder Weapon", Clement Yale series (#2 "...And the Stagnation of the Heart"), "Drake-Man Route", "Dreamer, Schemer", "Dream of Distance" (essay), "Send Her Victorious" (novelette), "The Serpent of Kundalini", "The Tell-Tale Heart-Machine", "Total Environment" (novelette), "The Village Swindler", "When I Was Very Jung", "The Worm That Flies", Jerry Cornelius series ("The Firmament Theorem"), "Greeks Bringing Knee-High Gifts", "The Humming Heads", "The Moment of Eclipse", "Ouspenski's Astrabahn" (novelette), "Since the Assassination" (novella), "So Far from Prague", "The Soft Predicament" (novelette), The Supertoys Trilogy (#1 "Supertoys Last All Summer Long"), "That Uncomfortable Pause Between Life and Art", "Working in the Spaceship Yards"
  6. The Complete Short Stories: The 1970s (Part 1) (2016)
  7. The Complete Short Stories: The 1970s (Part 2) (2016)
  8. The Complete Short Stories: The 1980s (Part 1) (2016)
  9. The Complete Short Stories: The 1980s (Part 2) (2016)
  10. The Complete Short Stories: The 1990s (2016)

Uncollected short stories:

- "Index to Life" (1954)
- "Ultimate Construction" (1967), as C. C. Shackleton
- "The Hunter at His Ease" (1970)
- "The Secret of Holman Hunt and the Crude Death Rate" (1970)
- "The Weather on Demansky Island" (1970)
- "The Day Equality Broke Out" (1971)
- "Manuscript Found in a Police State" (1972)
- "The Ergot Show" (1972)
- "Strange in a Familiar Way" (1973)
- "The Planet at the Bottom of the Garden" (1973)
- "Serpent Burning on an Altar" (1973)
- "The Young Soldier's Horoscope" (1973)
- "Woman in Sunlight with Mandolin" (1973)
- Enigma series:
  - Three Enigmas I:
    1. "The Enigma of Her Voyage" (1973)
    2. "I Ching, Who You?" (1973)
    3. "The Great Chain of Being What?" (1973)
  - Three Enigmas II: The Eternal Theme Of Exile:
    1. "The Eternal Theme of Exile" (1973)
    2. "All Those Enduring Old Charms" (1973)
    3. "Nobody Spoke Or Waved Goodbye" (1973)
  - Three Enigmas III: All in God's Mind:
    1. "The Unbearableness of Other Lives" (1974)
    2. "The Old Fleeing and Fleeting Images" (1974)
    3. "Looking on the Sunny Side of an Eclipse" (1974)
  - Diagrams For Three (Enigmatic) Stories:
    1. "The Girl in the Tau-Dream" (1974)
    2. "The Immobility Crew" (1974)
    3. "A Cultural Side-Effect" (1974)
  - Three Songs for Enigmatic Lovers:
    1. "A One-Man Expedition Through Life" (1974)
    2. "The Taste of Shrapnel" (1974)
    3. "40 Million Miles from the Nearest Blonde" (1974)
  - Three Enigmas IV: Three Coins in [Enigmatic|Clockwork] Fountain:
    1. "Carefully Observed Women" (1975)
    2. "The Daffodil Returns the Smile" (1975)
    3. "The Year of the Quiet Computer" (1975)
  - Three Deadly Enigmas: V: Year by Year the Evil Gains:
    1. "Within the Black Circle" (1975)
    2. "Killing Off the Big Animals" (1975)
    3. "What Are You Doing? Why Are You Doing It?" (1975)
  - The Aperture Moment:
    1. "Waiting for the Universe to Begin" (1975)
    2. "But Without Orifices" (1975)
    3. "Aimez-Vous Holman Hunt?" (1975)
  - Three Revolutionary Enigmas:
    1. "The Fall of Species B" (1980)
    2. "In the Halls of the Hereafter" (1980)
    3. "The Ancestral Home of Thought" (1980)
  - Her Toes Were Beautiful on the [Hilltops|Mountains]:
    1. "Another Way Than Death" (1992)
    2. "That Particular Green of Obsequies" (1992)
  - Three Moon Enigmas:
    1. "His Seventieth Heaven" (1995)
    2. "Rose in the Evening" (1995)
    3. "On the Inland Sea" (1995)
- "I dreamed I was Jung last night" (1974)
- "Melancholia has a Plastic Core" (1974)
- "Always Somebody There" (1975)
- "Excommunication" (1975)
- "How Did the Dinosaurs Do It?" (1976)
- "In the Mist of Life" (1977)
- "The Bang-Bang" (1977), novelette
- "My Lady of the Psychiatric Sorrows" (1977)
- "Yin, Yang and Jung: Three Galactic Enigmas" (1978)
- "Modernisation" (1980)
- "End Game" (1981)
- "Call Yourself a Christian" (1982)
- "How the Boy Icarus Grew Up and, After a Legendary Disaster, Learnt New Things About Himself and the External World, Until He Was Able to Comprehend the Magic That Had Been His in His Earliest Years /or/ Second Flight" (1982)
- "Parasites of Passion" (1982)
- "The Captain's Analysis" (1982)
- "An Admirer of Einstein" (1983)
- "The Immortal Storm Strikes Again" (1983)
- "Another Story on the Theme of the Last Man on Earth" (1985)
- "Domestic Catastrophe" (1985)
- "Operation Other Cheek" (1985)
- "Possessed by Love" (1985)
- "Silence After the Silence" (1985)
- "The Greatest Saga of All Time" (1985), as C. C. Shackleton
- "The Monster of Loch Awe" (1985)
- "The Fatal Break" (1987)
- "The Hero" (1987)
- "The Merdeka Hotel" (1987)
- "The Price of Cabbages" (1987)
- "Thursday" (1987)
- "Tourney" (1987)
- "Conversation on Progress" (1988)
- "Hess" (1988)
- "Sex and the Black Machine" (1988)
- "Wordsworth Halucinates" (1988)
- "The Day the Earth Caught Fire" (1989)
- "Adventures in the Fur Trade" (1990)
- "People—Alone—Injury—Artwork" (1991)
- "Kindred Blood in Kensington Gore" (1992)
- "Softly – As in an Evening Sunrise" (1992)
- "English Garden" (1993)
- "Friendship Bridge" (1993), novelette
- "The Servant Problem" (1994)
- "The Monster of Everyday Life" (1994)
- "The Madonna of Futurity" (1994), novella
- "Into the Tunnel!" (1995)
- "Compulsory Holidays For All" (1995)
- "The Law Against Trivia" (1996)
- "The Enigma of the Three Moons" (1997)
- "Death, Shit, Love, Transfiguration" (1997)
- "An Apollo Asteroid" (1999)
- "The Rain Will Stop" (2000, The Pretentious Press), written in 1942
- "A Single-Minded Artist" (2001)
- "Happiness in Reverse" (2001)
- "Talking Cubes" (2001)
- Supertoys series:
  - "Supertoys: Play Can Be So Deadly" (2001)
  - "Supertoys: What Fun to Be Reborn" (2001)
- "A New (governmental) Father Christmas", or "A New (governmental) Father Christmas: A Moral Tale for All in Headington" (2002)
- "Near Earth Object" (2002)
- "Ten Billion of Them" (2005)
- "Pipeline" (2005), novelette
- "Building Sixteen" (2006)
- "Tiger in the Night" (2006)
- "Safe!" (2006)
- "Life, Learning, Leipzig and a Librarian" (2007)
- "Four Ladies of the Apocalypse" (2007)
- "Peculiar Bone, Unimaginable Key" (2008)
- "Fandom at the Palace" (2008)
- "The First-Born" (2010)
- "Hapless Humanity" (2010)
- Doctor Who series:
  - "Umwelts for Hire" (2010), Doctor Who Brilliant Book 2011 (2010, BBC Books, ISBN 978-1-84607-991-7)
- "Benkoelen" (2011)
- "Less Than Kin, More Than Kind" (2011)
- "The Mighty Mi Tok of Beijing" (2013)
- "Abundances Above" (2016)

=== Poems ===
Collections:

- Farewell to a Child (1982), collection of 10 poems:
  "Found", "Lost", "The Commitment", "When We Were Four", "With Vacant Possession", "The Child Departs: a dialogue", "The Eternal Child", "The Frozen Boy", "The Haunting", "The Malediction"
- Home Life With Cats (1992), collection of 34 poems:
  "Out of the Night", "The Cats' Heaven", "Kittens (Two)", "Slaves", "Where Have You Been?", "Yum-Yum", "Heatwave", "Cats' Nerves", "Foxie", "Jackson", "Town-Life", "Nickie", "The Two-Kitten Problem", "Macramé's Lament", "Travelling Cats", "The Cat Improvement Company", "On a Favourite Goldfish Drowned in a Bowl of Cats", "Portrait of a Cat with Lady", "An Evening at Home", "Tatty's Tie-Shop", "Snacks", "Who Owns the House?", "A Riddle", "How I Swam Out to Sea with My Cat", "A Lion for Tea", "The Cat in the Cathedral", "The Poor Man's Cat", "Mutual Regard", "First Birthday", "Rules", "Relating to the Pet", "The Cat Speaks", "Michael, the Cycling Cat", "The Lost Grave"
- At the Caligula Hotel and Other Poems (1995), collection of 74 poems, grouped in four sections:
  I. Imagery?: "At the Caligula Hotel", Chinese Exercises ("Lu Tai", "Nocturne", "Interval", "Indecision", "Journeying", "Poems from a Later Dynasty III: Who Hears My Voice?"), "Exit Aquascutum", "While Feeding Parrots", "Winter Bites Deep", "Breughel's Hunters in the Snow", "Anau: The Well", "The Cynar, Istanbul", "Dawn in Kuala Lumpur", "Gauguin's Tahiti"
  II. Everyday?: "No, I was Never Deaf or Blind to Her Music", "Toledo: Three Ladies", "Government", "Moonglow: for Margaret", "Alfie Cogitates on Life", "Memories of Palic", "Boars Hill: the Sycamores and the Oaks", "All Things Transfigure", "Trapped in the Present", "The Path", "Suburban Sunday", "Nature Notes: Early September", "Willow Cottage", "Cold Snap", "Stoney Ground", "The Triumph of the Superficial", "The Twentieth Camp", "Good Fortune", "Communication", "A Summery Meditation on Money", "A Moment of Suspense", "Fragment of a Longer Poem"
  III. Literary?: "Short Stories", "What Did the Policeman Say?", "Hamlet Folk", "The Poor", "On Reading Poetry in Berkhamsted", "Poem Inspired by Scott Meredith", Two Painters ("I: Francis Bacon", "II: Fernand Khnopff"), "Light of Ancient Days", "Mary Shelley, 1916", "Victor Frankenstein on the Mer de Glace", "The Shelleys – To a Lady who spoke of their 'Mystery'", "The Created One Speaks", "Mary in Italy", "Looking It Up", "Rice Pudding", "Writer's Life"
  IV. Scientific?: "Greenhouse Sex", "Lunar Anatomy", "Monemvasia", "Found", "Destruction of the Fifth Planet", "Femalien", "Thomas Hardy Considers the Newly-Published Special Theory of Relativity", "'Rhine Locks are Closed in Battle Against Poison'", "The Cat Improvement Company", "The Expanding Universe", "To a Triceratops Skull in the British Museum", "The Light", "Flight 063", Precarious Passions ("I: A Brain Pursues its Vanished Dream", "II: A Woman Marries the Southern Ocean", "III: Ascension Island Courts a Whale", "IV: A Refrigerator Proposes to a Musk Ox", "V: A Book Falls in Love with its Reader", "VI: A Lamp Standard Courts the Stars"), "Alphabet of Ameliorating Hope"
- Songs from the Steppes of Central Asia: The Collected Poems of Makhtumkuli: Eighteenth Century Poet-Hero of Turkmenistan (1995)
- A Plutonian Monologue on His Wife's Death (2000, The Frogmore Papers), collection of 7 poems
- At a Bigger House (2002), collection of 48 poems:
  "Hazards of the Trail", "Perspectives", "Presentiments of Dawn", "Now Showing: 'Killing Father'", "The World of Lost Content", "Flight 063", "Railway Engine Pulling Slowly", "The Deceptive Truth", "Colour Contrasts", "Fairy Tales", "The Women", "They Who Waited", "The Bonfire of Time", "The Foot Speaks", "The Ghost Koi", "Rapide des Morts", "The Teeth of Time", "Elizabeth Jennings (Died October 2001)", "'War and Peace': A Song for Mathilde Mauguiere", "Her Beautiful Thing", "The Hunters in the Snow", "Aral Seasons", "Uzbecks in London", "Poem from Life in the West", "Many Mansions", "The Horse Unburied", "The Red Pavilion", "Blythborough Church, A Hardyesque Dialogue", "Insomnia", "Awake at Three A.M.", "The Start of Something", "Retrospection: At the Temple of Aphaia, on the Island of Aegina, Greece", "Hors d'Oeuvres for my Lady", "The Barney", "Dawn in KL", "A Funeral Service: Kingsley Amis, 31st October 1995", "On Passing a Roadside Auction of Featherbeds, Lake District, 1845", "City Scene", "The Prehistory of the Mind", "April in East Coker", "Seeking Love", "The New Wing", "Xenophilia", "Name-Dripping", "Dora/Dinah", "Volcano", "Monemvasia", "The Moment"
- The Dark Sun Rises (2002), collection of 50 poems:
  "The Dark Sun Rises", "Venice and Istanbul", "Perspectives", "Monemvasia", "The Deceptive Truth", "The Moment", "On Passing a Roadside Auction of Featherbeds, Lake District, 1845", "Retrospection: At the Temple of Aphaia, on the Island of Aegina, Greece", "Rapide des Morts", "Flight 063", "Aral Seasons", "Uzbecks in London", "Poem from Life in the West", "Insomnia", "Meum Tuumque", "Partings from Oedipus on Mars", "The Barney", "Blythborough Church, A Hardyesque Dialogue", "Not Speaking of You", "The Silent Love", "'War and Peace': A Song for Mathilde Mauguiere", "Her Beautiful Thing", "Rondeau after Leigh Hunt", "Jocasta", "Jane Eyre at Elsinore", "The Carnivores", "The Garden at Number Thirty-Nine", "The Horse Unburied", "The Garden", "In the RA Friends' Room June '95", "They Who Waited", "Colour Contrasts", "The Red Pavilion", "The Women", "Hazards of the Trail", "Many Mansions", "The Start of Something", "The Prehistory of the Mind", "The World of Lost Content", "Volcano", "Dendrochronology", "The Foot Speaks", "Fairy Tales", "Now Showing: 'Killing Father'", "A Piece of Cleopatra", "Cliché Love", "'Eatin' Regular Again': A Pop Song", "The Cat Improvement Company", "At the Caligula Hotel", "untitled (re: myth of Santa Claus)"
- Mortal Morning (2011)

Uncollected poems:

- "There Are No More Good Stories About Mars Because We Need No More Good Stories About Mars" (1963)
- "Bridging Hours in Wesciv" (1969)
- "Drama on the River Cherwell" (1974)
- "Epitaph for a Writer" (1974)
- "In Another Town: Bologna" (1974)
- "Innovation in the Arts" (1974)
- "Mon Frère" (1974)
- "Taking Leave of a Cold Country" (1974)
- "The Lady Literary Agent" (1974)
- "Verse in a Country Garden" (1974)
- "Summer: 1773" (1976)
- "Pile: Petals from St. Klaed's Computer" (1979)
- "Sleep" (1983)
- "Tra La" (1994)

=== Plays ===
- Patagonia's Delicious Filling Station: Three One-act Plays (1975), collection
- Enigma series:
  - The Bones of Bertrand Russell: A Tryptich of Absurd Enigmatic Plays:
    1. "Futurity Takes a Hand" (1976)
    2. "Through a Galaxy Backwards" (1976)
    3. "Where Walls Are Hung with Multi-Media Portraits" (1976)
- Distant Encounters (1978)

=== Not categorised fiction ===
- Courageous New Planet (c. 1984)

=== Non-fiction ===
Autobiographies

- ... And the Lurid Glare of the Comet (1986), articles and autobiography
- Bury My Heart at W.H. Smith's: A Writing Life (1990)
- The Twinkling of an Eye, or My Life as an Englishman (1998)
- When the Feast is Finished (1999), with Margaret Aldiss
- An Exile on Planet Earth: Articles and Reflections (2012), articles and autobiography

Science fiction

- The Shape of Further Things, or The Shape of Further Things: Speculation on Change (1970)
- Billion Year Spree series:
  1. Billion Year Spree: The History of Science Fiction (1973)
    BSFA special award
  2. Trillion Year Spree: The History of Science Fiction (1986), with David Wingrove, a revised and expanded version of Billion Year Spree
    Winner of the 1987 Hugo Award for Best Non-Fiction Book. At the awards ceremony, Aldiss began his acceptance speech by holding the Hugo aloft and proclaiming, to general approbation, "It's been a long time since you've given me one of these, you bastards!"
- SF Horizons (1975), with Harry Harrison
- Science Fiction as Science Fiction (1978)
- Science Fiction Quiz (1983)
- The Pale Shadow of Science, or Pale Shadow of Science (1985), collected essays
- The Detached Retina: Aspects of SF and Fantasy (1995)

Others

- Cities and Stones: A Traveller's Yugoslavia (1966)
- Item Eighty-Three: Brian W. Aldiss – A Bibliography 1954–1972 (1972), with Margaret Aldiss, a bibliography of Aldiss's published works, this book being number 83
- Science Fiction Art (1975)
- This World and Nearer Ones: Essays Exploring the Familiar (1979)
- Art After Apogee (2000), with Rosemary Phipps, essays
- Researches and Churches in Serbia (2002), collection of 9 articles

=== Anthologies edited ===
- Penguin Science Fiction series:
  1. Penguin Science Fiction (1961)
  2. More Penguin Science Fiction (1963)
  3. Yet More Penguin Science Fiction (1964)
  Omnibus edition, The Penguin Science Fiction Omnibus (1973)
- Best Fantasy Stories (1962)
- Introducing SF (1964)
- Nebula Award Stories Two (1967), with Harry Harrison
- Farewell, Fantastic Venus (1968)
- The Year's Best Science Fiction series, with Harry Harrison:
  1. The Year's Best Science Fiction No. 1 (1968)
  2. The Year's Best Science Fiction No. 2, or Best SF: 1968 (1969)
  3. The Year's Best Science Fiction No. 3, or Best SF: 1969 (1970)
  4. The Year's Best Science Fiction No. 4 (1971)
  5. The Year's Best Science Fiction No. 5 (1972)
  6. The Year's Best Science Fiction No. 6, or Best SF: 1972 (1973)
  7. The Year's Best Science Fiction No. 7, or Best SF: 1973 (1974)
  8. The Year's Best Science Fiction No. 8 (1976)
  9. The Year's Best Science Fiction No. 9, or The Year's Best SF 9 (1976)
- Space Opera (1974)
- Space Odysseys (1975)
- Hell's Cartographers: Some Personal Histories of Science Fiction Writers (1975), with Harry Harrison, a collection of short autobiographical pieces by a number of science fiction writers, including Aldiss. The title is a reference to Kingsley Amis's survey of science fiction, New Maps of Hell.
- Decade series, with Harry Harrison:
  1. Decade: the 1940s (1975)
  2. Decade: the 1950s (1976)
  3. Decade: the 1960s (1979)
- Evil Earths (1976)
- Galactic Empires series:
  1. Galactic Empires. Volume One (1976)
  2. Galactic Empires. Volume Two (1976)
- Perilous Planets (1978)
- The Penguin World Omnibus of Science Fiction (1986)
- Mini Sagas: From The Daily Telegraph Competition series:
  - Mini Sagas: From The Daily Telegraph Competition (1998) ISBN 978-0-7509-1594-6
  - Mini Sagas: From The Daily Telegraph Competition 2001 (2001) ISBN 978-1-900564-77-9
- A Science Fiction Omnibus (2007) ISBN 978-0-14-118892-8
- The Folio Science Fiction Anthology (2016)

== Adaptations ==
- Frankenstein Unbound (1990), film directed by Roger Corman, based on novel Frankenstein Unbound
- A.I. Artificial Intelligence (2001), film directed by Steven Spielberg, based on short story "Supertoys Last All Summer Long"
- Brothers of the Head (2005), film directed by Keith Fulton and Louis Pepe, based on novel Brothers of the Head
