= Dreams Are Sacred =

1948 short story by Peter Phillips

"Dreams are Sacred" is a science fiction short story by British writer Peter Phillips. It was first published in the American magazine Astounding Science Fiction in September 1948. It is an early example of what later came to be called a "virtual reality" story, in which one person enters a dream or hallucination that is being experienced by another.

== Plot ==
Pete Parnell is a cynical sports reporter. Early in his childhood, he was cured of frequent nightmares by being taught how to shoot a Colt 45 revolver on the farm where he lived. He was then able to imagine the gun in his dreams and use it to "kill" the monsters. He went on to serve in the army before becoming a reporter.

Parnell is called by a friend, Steve Blakiston, who is a psychiatrist using experimental equipment. A patient called Marsham Craswell, a famous writer of "sword and sorcery" fantasy novels, has retreated into a state where he is living a dream in the fantasy world he created. Pete is asked to enter that dream using the new device and bring Craswell back to reality. Doing this requires somebody who is totally immune, and indeed hostile, to the fantasy. Blakiston confesses that he is a fan of Craswell's work and would almost certainly suffer the same fate as the author.

Entering the dream, Parnell finds himself dressed in ordinary clothes, standing in a hot desert under two suns, facing Craswell who has imagined himself into the hero role, calling himself "Multan". He quickly starts altering the dream, eliminating one of the suns to cool off. Craswell accuses him of being "Garor", apparently the evil antagonist of the story, and attacks him with a sword. Fortunately Parnell imagines his army helmet on his head and deflects the blow. Craswell adapts to make him an ally in his quest, calling him "Nelpar Retrep of the Seven Moons". They are attacked by an army of Garor's warriors, but Parnell conjures up one of his friends, an Irish cop, who brings in car loads of tough police officers that rout the army.

Craswell announces that they must make a long journey to the fortress of Garor, so Parnell conjures up a New York taxicab, along with the same driver who took him to Blakiston's lab. After a short trip the driver tries to overcharge them, so Parnell tells him to "Go to Hell" and has the desert sand swallow up the taxi. They gain entry to the fortress when Parnell conjures up a doorbell. Attacked by a living gas, they escape when Parnell remembers his Army gas mask and turns a flamethrower on the cloud. He counters "music that drives men mad" with his own performance of "Tiger Rag" on the harmonica, with amplification.

Finally they encounter the evil sorceress Garor, who is a beauty imagined in such detail that Parnell concludes she must be based on somebody real. She is dressed in classic fantasy style, in a skimpy breastplate and short filmy skirt. To irritate Craswell, Parnell lengthens the skirt, only to have Craswell revert it. They do this repeatedly until Craswell abruptly switches them into an arena where Parnell is left to face a fearsome beast. At this point Parnell begins to feel genuine fear, but he quickly remembers his childhood and produces the gun, with which he kills the beast.

Craswell, unable to maintain the fantasy, collapses the dream. Parnell awakes and is quickly removed from the equipment, as patients are likely to be angry when woken from the treatment.

Later Parnell meets his friend, the Irish cop, who remembers dreaming about him. He also sees the taxi driver again, and gets the same reaction. Calling Blakiston, he is told that perhaps the apparatus turned into a transmitter while he was in the dream with Craswell. Blakiston invites him to try it again, but Parnell declines.

At a bar he sees a singer who is obviously the woman on whom Craswell based the Garor character. She seems to recognize him and admits to knowing Craswell, but says she was not asleep when he was at the lab. Still, she takes a dislike to him, as if she experienced the business with Garor's costume. Parnell decides to go back to the lab to see if he can work on improving their relationship.

== In other media ==
The story was adapted as "Get Off My Cloud" (1969), an episode of Out of the Unknown, a BBC television series featuring stories taken, initially, from science fiction magazines.

Out of the Unknown featured similar techniques, settings and costumes to other BBC sci-fi productions of the time. In particular, in "Get Off My Cloud" three Daleks and their operators from Doctor Who were used to represent the monsters in young Pete's nightmares, with their voices provided by Dalek voice actor Peter Hawkins.

The production cast actors well-known to BBC viewers, including Peter Barkworth as Stephen, the psychiatrist, and Peter Jeffrey as Craswell.

Only audio clips and photographs of this episode exist. The master videotape was wiped by the corporation in the 1970s and the film copies were junked. As such, the full teleplay is no longer known to exist.

== Analysis and significance ==
The work has been described as pioneering the sf trope of "dream hacking" and is seen as one of the first examples of the "inner space" genre.
