= Isaac Asimov bibliography (categorical) =

Depending on the counting convention used, and including all titles, charts, and edited collections, there may be currently over 500 books in Isaac Asimov's bibliography—as well as his individual short stories, individual essays, and criticism. For his 100th, 200th, and 300th books (based on his personal count), Asimov published Opus 100 (1969), Opus 200 (1979), and Opus 300 (1984), celebrating his writing.

Asimov was so prolific that his books span all major categories of the Dewey Decimal Classification except for category 100: philosophy and psychology. Although Asimov did write several essays about psychology, and forewords for the books The Humanist Way (1988) and In Pursuit of Truth (1982), which were classified in the 100s category, none of his own books were classified in that category.

According to UNESCO's Index Translationum database, Asimov is the world's 24th most-translated author.

An online exhibit in West Virginia University Libraries' virtually complete Asimov Collection displays features, visuals, and descriptions of some of his over 600 books, games, audio recordings, videos, and wall charts. Many first, rare, and autographed editions are in the Libraries' Rare Book Room. Book jackets and autographs are presented online along with descriptions and images of children's books, science fiction art, multimedia, and other materials in the collection.

For a listing of Asimov's science fiction books in chronological order within his future history, see the Foundation series list of books.

== Science fiction ==
=== Novels ===
"Greater Foundation" series

The Robot series was originally separate from the Foundation series. The Galactic Empire novels were published as independent stories, set earlier in the same universe as Foundation. Later in life, Asimov synthesized the Robot series into a single coherent "history" that appeared in the extension of the Foundation series.

1. Robot series:
  1. Asimov, Isaac (1954). The Caves of Steel. National Geographic Books. ISBN 0-553-29340-0. (first Elijah Baley SF-crime novel)
  2. Asimov, Isaac (1957). The Naked Sun. Random House Worlds. ISBN 0-553-29339-7. (second Elijah Baley SF-crime novel)
  3. Asimov, Isaac (1983). The Robots of Dawn. Random House Worlds. ISBN 0-553-29949-2. (third Elijah Baley SF-crime novel)
  4. Asimov, Isaac (1985). Robots and Empire. HarperCollins. ISBN 978-0-586-06200-5. (sequel to the Elijah Baley trilogy)
2. Galactic Empire series:
  1. Asimov, Isaac (1952). The Currents of Space. ISBN 0-553-29341-9. (Republic of Trantor still expanding)
  2. Asimov, Isaac (1951). The Stars, Like Dust. Bantam Books. ISBN 0-553-29343-5. (long before the Empire)
  3. Asimov, Isaac (1950). Pebble in the Sky. Bantam Books. ISBN 0-553-29342-7. (early Galactic Empire)
3. Foundation series:
  1. Foundation prequels series:
    1. Asimov, Isaac (1988). Prelude to Foundation. Random House Worlds. ISBN 0-553-27839-8. (occurs before Foundation)
    2. Asimov, Isaac (1993). Forward the Foundation. Bantam. ISBN 0-553-40488-1. (occurs after Prelude to Foundation and before Foundation)
  2. Original Foundation trilogy:
    1. Asimov, Isaac (1951). Foundation. National Geographic Books. ISBN 0-553-29335-4.
    2. Asimov, Isaac (1952). Foundation and Empire. Random House Worlds. ISBN 0-553-29337-0., Published with the title 'The Man Who Upset the Universe' as a 35c Ace paperback, D-125, in about 1952
    3. Asimov, Isaac (1953). Second Foundation. Random House Worlds. ISBN 0-553-29336-2.
  3. Extended Foundation series:
    1. Asimov, Isaac (1982). Foundation's Edge. National Geographic Books. ISBN 0-553-29338-9.
    2. Asimov, Isaac (1986). Foundation and Earth. National Geographic Books. ISBN 0-553-58757-9. (last of the Foundation series)

Stand-alones

Novels marked with an asterisk (*) have minor connections to the Foundation universe.

- The End of Eternity (1955)*
- Fantastic Voyage (1966), a novelization of the movie Fantastic Voyage
- The Gods Themselves (1972)
- Fantastic Voyage II: Destination Brain (1987), not a sequel to Fantastic Voyage, but a similar, independent story
- Nemesis (1989)*
- Nightfall (1990), with Robert Silverberg, based on "Nightfall", a 1941 novelette written by Asimov
- Child of Time (1992), with Robert Silverberg, based on "The Ugly Little Boy", a 1958 novelette written by Asimov
- The Positronic Man (1993)*, with Robert Silverberg, based on The Bicentennial Man, a 1976 novelette written by Asimov

=== Young adult novels ===
Lucky Starr series (as Paul French):

1. David Starr, Space Ranger (1952)
2. Lucky Starr and the Pirates of the Asteroids (1953)
3. Lucky Starr and the Oceans of Venus (1954)
4. Lucky Starr and the Big Sun of Mercury (1956)
5. Lucky Starr and the Moons of Jupiter (1957)
6. Lucky Starr and the Rings of Saturn (1958)

=== Children's novels ===
The Norby Chronicles (with Janet Asimov):

1. Norby, the Mixed-Up Robot (1983)
2. Norby's Other Secret (1984)
3. Norby and the Lost Princess (1985)
4. Norby and the Invaders (1985)
5. Norby and the Queen's Necklace (1986)
6. Norby Finds a Villain (1987)
7. Norby Down to Earth (1988)
8. Norby and Yobo's Great Adventure (1989)
9. Norby and the Oldest Dragon (1990)
10. Norby and the Court Jester (1991)

=== Short stories ===
Collections:

- Asimov, Isaac (1950). I, Robot. National Geographic Books. ISBN 0-553-29438-5., collection of 5 short stories and 4 novelettes of Robot series:
  "Robbie", "Runaround" (novelette), "Reason", "Catch That Rabbit", "Liar!", "Little Lost Robot" (novelette), "Escape!", "Evidence" (novelette), "The Evitable Conflict" (novelette)
- Asimov, Isaac (1955). The Martian Way and Other Stories. R. Bentley. ISBN 0-8376-0463-X., collection of 4 novelettes/novellas:
  "The Martian Way" (novelette), "Youth" (novelette), "The Deep" (novelette), "Sucker Bait" (novella)
- Asimov, Isaac (1957). Earth Is Room Enough. Fawcett Crest. ISBN 0-449-24125-4., collection of 14 short stories, 1 novelette and 2 poems:
  "The Dead Past" (novelette, Multivac series), "The Foundation of S.F. Success" (poem), "Franchise" (Multivac series), "Gimmicks Three", "Kid Stuff", "The Watery Place", "Living Space", "The Message", "Satisfaction Guaranteed" (Robot series), "Hell-Fire", "The Last Trump", "The Fun They Had", "Jokester" (Multivac series), "The Immortal Bard", "Someday" (Robot series, Multivac series), "The Author's Ordeal" (poem), "Dreaming Is a Private Thing"
- Asimov, Isaac (1959). Nine Tomorrows. Fawcett Crest. ISBN 0-449-24084-3., collection of 6 short stories, 3 novelettes/novellas and 2 poems:
  "I Just Make Them Up, See!" (poem), "Profession" (novella), "The Feeling of Power", "The Dying Night" (novelette, Wendell Urth series), "I'm in Marsport Without Hilda", "The Gentle Vultures", "All the Troubles of the World" (Multivac series), "Spell My Name with an S", "The Last Question" (Multivac series), "The Ugly Little Boy" (novelette), "Rejection Slips" (poem)
- Asimov, Isaac (1964). The Rest of the Robots. Doubleday. ISBN 0-385-09041-2., collection of 6 short stories, 2 novelettes and 2 novels of Robot series:
  "Robot AL-76 Goes Astray", "Victory Unintentional" (also Jovians series #2), "First Law", "Let's Get Together", "Satisfaction Guaranteed", "Risk" (novelette), "Lenny", "Galley Slave" (novelette), The Caves of Steel (novel), The Naked Sun (novel)
- Asimov, Isaac (1967). Through a Glass, Clearly. Ian Henry Publications. ISBN 0-86025-124-1., collection of 4 novelettes:
  "It's Such a Beautiful Day", "Belief", "Breeds There a Man...?", "C-Chute"
- Nightfall and Other Stories. 1969. ISBN 0-449-01969-1., collection of 14 short stories and 6 novelettes:
  "Nightfall" (novelette), "Green Patches", "Hostess" (novelette), "Breeds There a Man...?" (novelette), "C-Chute" (novelette), "In a Good Cause—" (novelette), "What If—", "Sally" (Robot series), "Flies", "Nobody Here But—", "It's Such a Beautiful Day" (novelette), "Strikebreaker", "Insert Knob A in Hole B", "The Up-to-Date Sorcerer", "Unto the Fourth Generation", "What Is This Thing Called Love?", "The Machine That Won the War" (Multivac series), "My Son, the Physicist" (Multivac series), "Eyes Do More Than See", "Segregationist" (Robot series)
- The Early Asimov. 1972. ISBN 0-449-02850-X., collection of 19 short stories and 8 novelettes:
  "The Callistan Menace", "Ring Around the Sun", "The Magnificent Possession", "Trends", "The Weapon Too Dreadful to Use", "Black Friar of the Flame" (novelette), "Half-Breed" (novelette, Half-Breed series #1), "The Secret Sense", "Homo Sol" (Homo Sol series #1), "Half-Breeds on Venus" (novelette, Half-Breed series #2), "The Imaginary" (Homo Sol series #2), "Heredity" (novelette), "History", "Christmas on Ganymede", "The Little Man on the Subway", "The Hazing" (Homo Sol series #3), "Super-Neutron", "Not Final!" (Jovians series #1), "Legal Rites" (novelette), "Time Pussy" (Probability Zero series), "Author! Author!" (novelette), "Death Sentence", "Blind Alley" (Galactic Empire series #4), "No Connection", "The Endochronic Properties of Resublimated Thiotimoline" (Thiotimoline series #1), "The Red Queen's Race" (novelette), "Mother Earth" (novelette, Robot series)
- Asimov, Isaac (1973). The Best of Isaac Asimov. Sphere Books. ISBN 0-7221-1256-4., collection of 5 short stories and 7 novelettes:
  "Marooned off Vesta" (Brandon, Shea & Moore series #1), "Nightfall" (novelette), "C-Chute" (novelette), "The Martian Way" (novelette), "The Deep" (novelette), "The Fun They Had", "The Last Question" (Multivac series), "The Dead Past" (novelette, Multivac series), "The Dying Night" (novelette, Wendell Urth series), "Anniversary" (Multivac series, Brandon, Shea & Moore series #2), "The Billiard Ball" (novelette), "Mirror Image" (Robot series #2.5)
- Have You Seen These?. 1974., collection of 8 short stories:
  "Day of the Hunters", "Shah Guido G.", "The Monkey's Finger", "Everest", "The Pause", "Blank!", "Silly Asses", "Rain, Rain, Go Away"
- Asimov, Isaac (1975). Buy Jupiter and Other Stories. Doubleday. ISBN 0-385-05077-1., collection of 24 short stories:
  "Darwinian Pool Room", "Day of the Hunters", "Shah Guido G.", "Button, Button", "The Monkey's Finger", "Everest", "The Pause", "Let's Not", "Each an Explorer", "Blank!", "Does a Bee Care?", "Silly Asses", "Buy Jupiter", "A Statue for Father", "Rain, Rain, Go Away", "Founding Father", "Exile to Hell", "Key Item" (Multivac series), "The Proper Study", "2430 A.D.", "The Greatest Asset", "Take a Match", "Thiotimoline to the Stars" (Thiotimoline series #4), "Light Verse" (Robot series)
- "The Dream", "Benjamin's Dream" and "Benjamin's Bicentennial Blast". 1976., collection of 3 short stories from Dream series:
  "The Dream" (#1), "Benjamin's Dream" (#2), "Benjamin's Bicentennial Blast" (#4)
- Asimov, Isaac (1976). The Bicentennial Man and Other Stories. Gollancz. ISBN 0-575-02240-X., collection of 6 short stories, 5 novelettes and 1 poem:
  "The Prime of Life" (poem), "Feminine Intuition" (novelette, Robot series), "Waterclap" (novelette), "That Thou Art Mindful of Him" (novelette, Robot series), "Stranger in Paradise" (novelette, Robot series), "The Life and Times of Multivac" (Multivac series), "The Winnowing", "The Bicentennial Man" (novelette, Robot series), "Marching In", "Old-fashioned", "The Tercentenary Incident" (Robot series), "Birth of a Notion"
- 3 by Asimov. 1981., collection of 3 short stories:
  "The Last Answer", "True Love" (Robot series, Multivac series), "Fair Exchange?"
- The Complete Robot. 1982., collection of 21 short stories and 10 novelettes from Robot series:
  "A Boy's Best Friend", "Sally", "Someday" (also Multivac series), "Point of View" (also Multivac series), "Think!" (also Multivac series), "True Love" (also Multivac series), "Robot AL-76 Goes Astray", "Victory Unintentional" (Jovians series #2), "Stranger in Paradise" (novelette), "Light Verse", "Segregationist", "Robbie", "Let's Get Together", "Mirror Image" (#2.5), "The Tercentenary Incident", "First Law", "Runaround" (novelette), "Reason", "Catch That Rabbit", "Liar!", "Satisfaction Guaranteed", "Lenny", "Galley Slave" (novelette), "Little Lost Robot" (novelette), "Risk" (novelette), "Escape!", "Evidence" (novelette), "The Evitable Conflict" (novelette), "Feminine Intuition" (novelette), "...That Thou Art Mindful of Him" (novelette), "The Bicentennial Man" (novelette)
- Asimov, Isaac (1983). The Winds of Change and Other Stories. Doubleday. ISBN 0-385-18099-3., collection of 16 short stories and 5 novelettes:
  "About Nothing", "A Perfect Fit", "Belief" (novelette), "Death of a Foy", "Fair Exchange?", "For the Birds", "Found!", "Good Taste" (novelette), "How It Happened", "Ideas Die Hard" (novelette), "Ignition Point!", "It Is Coming" (Multivac series), "The Last Answer", "The Last Shuttle", "Lest We Remember" (novelette), "Nothing for Nothing", "One Night of Song" (Azazel series), "The Smile That Loses" (Azazel series), "Sure Thing", "To Tell at a Glance" (novelette), "The Winds of Change"
- Asimov, Isaac (1985). The Edge of Tomorrow. T. Doherty Associates. ISBN 0-312-93200-6., collection of 6 short stories, 6 novelettes and y 12 essays:
  "Unique Is Where You Find It" (Black Widowers series), "The Eureka Phenomenon" (essay), "The Feeling of Power", "The Comet That Wasn't" (essay), "Found!", "Twinkle, Twinkle, Microwaves" (essay), "Pâté de Foie Gras", "The Bridge of the Gods" (essay), "Belief" (novelette), "Euclid's Fifth" (essay), "The Plane Truth" (essay), "The Billiard Ball" (novelette), "The Winds of Change", "The Figure of the Fastest" (essay), "The Dead Past" (novelette, Multivac series), "The Fateful Lightning" (essay), "Breeds There a Man...?" (novelette), "The Man Who Massed the Earth" (essay), "Nightfall" (novelette), "The Planet That Wasn't" (essay), "The Ugly Little Boy" (novelette), "The Three Who Died Too Soon" (essay), "The Last Question" (Multivac series), "The Nobel Prize That Wasn't" (essay)
- Asimov, Isaac (1986). The Alternate Asimovs. Doubleday. ISBN 0-385-19784-5., collection of 3 drafts:
  Grow Old With Me (novel), "The End of Eternity" (novella), "Belief" (short story)
- Science Fiction by Asimov. 1986., collection of 6 short stories and 1 poem:
  "More Things in Heaven and Earth" (Azazel series), "Rejection Slips" (poem), "Death of a Foy", "Dashing Through the Snow" (Azazel series), "Potential" (Multivac series), "Eyes Do More Than See", "The Dim Rumble" (Azazel series)
- The Best Science Fiction of Isaac Asimov. 1986., collection of 23 short stories, 3 novelettes and 2 poems:
  "All the Troubles of the World" (Multivac series), "A Loint of Paw", "The Dead Past" (novelette, Multivac series), "Death of a Foy", "Dreaming Is a Private Thing", "Dreamworld", "Eyes Do More Than See", "The Feeling of Power", "Flies", "Found!", "The Foundation of S.F. Success" (poem), "Franchise" (Multivac series), "The Fun They Had", "How It Happened", "I Just Make Them Up, See!" (poem), "I'm in Marsport Without Hilda", "The Immortal Bard", "It's Such a Beautiful Day" (novelette), "Jokester" (Multivac series), "The Last Answer", "The Last Question" (Multivac series), "My Son, the Physicist" (Multivac series), "Obituary", "Spell My Name with an S", "Strikebreaker", "Sure Thing", "The Ugly Little Boy" (novelette), "Unto the Fourth Generation"
- Asimov, Isaac (1986). Robot Dreams. National Geographic Books. ISBN 0-441-73154-6., collection of 14 short stories and 7 novelettes:
  "Little Lost Robot" (novelette, Robot series), "Robot Dreams" (Robot series), "Breeds There a Man...?" (novelette), "Hostess" (novelette), "Sally" (Robot series), "Strikebreaker", "The Machine that Won the War" (Multivac series), "Eyes Do More Than See", "The Martian Way" (novelette), "Franchise" (Multivac series), "Jokester" (Multivac series), "The Last Question" (Multivac series), "Does a Bee Care?", "Light Verse" (Robot series), "The Feeling of Power", "Spell My Name with an S", "The Ugly Little Boy" (novelette), "The Billiard Ball" (novelette), "True Love" (Robot series, Multivac series), "The Last Answer", "Lest We Remember" (novelette)
- Other Worlds of Isaac Asimov. 1987., collection of 2 novels and 12 novelettes/novellas:
  The Gods Themselves (novel), "The C-Chute" (novelette), "The Dead Past" (novelette, Multivac series), "Hostess" (novelette), "'In a Good Cause—'" (novelette), "The Key" (novelette, Wendell Urth series), "Lest We Remember" (novelette), "The Martian Way" (novelette), "Nightfall" (novelette), "Profession" (novella), "Sucker Bait" (novella), "The Ugly Little Boy" (novelette), "Youth" (novelette), The End of Eternity (novel)
- Azazel. 1988., collection of 18 short stories from Azazel series:
  "The Two-Centimeter Demon", "One Night of Song", "The Smile That Loses", "To the Victor", "The Dim Rumble", "Saving Humanity", "A Matter of Principle", "The Evil Drink Does", "Writing Time", "Dashing Through the Snow", "Logic Is Logic", "He Travels the Fastest", "The Eye of the Beholder", "More Things in Heaven and Earth", "The Mind's Construction", "The Fights of Spring", "Galatea", "Flight of Fancy"
- The Asimov Chronicles: Fifty Years of Isaac Asimov. 1989., collection of 32 short stories, 16 novellas/novelettes and 2 essays:
  "Marooned Off Vesta" (Brandon, Shea & Moore series #1), "Robbie", "Nightfall" (novelette), "Runaround" (novelette, Robot series), "Death Sentence", "Catch That Rabbit", "Blind Alley" (Galactic Empire series #4), "Evidence" (novelette), "Little Lost Robot" (novelette, Robot series), "No Connection", "The Red Queen's Race" (novelette), "Green Patches", "Breeds There a Man ... ?" (novelette), "The Martian Way" (novelette), "Sally" (Robot series), "The Fun They Had", "Franchise" (Multivac series), "The Last Question" (Multivac series), "Profession" (novella), "The Ugly Little Boy" (novelette), "Unto the Fourth Generation", "Thiotimoline and the Space Age" (Thiotimoline series #3), "The Machine That Won the War" (Multivac series), "My Son, the Physicist!" (Multivac series), "T-Formation" (essay), "Author! Author!" (novelette), "Eyes Do More Than See", "The Key" (novelette, Wendell Urth series), "The Billiard Ball" (novelette), "Exile to Hell", "Feminine Intuition" (novelette, Robot series), "A Problem of Numbers", "Bill and I" (essay), "Mirror Image" (Robot series #2.5), "Light Verse" (Robot series), "—That Thou Art Mindful of Him!" (novelette, Robot series), "Earthset and Evening Star" (Black Widowers series), "The Bicentennial Man" (novelette, Robot series), "True Love" (Robot series, Multivac series), "Found!", "Nothing for Nothing", "For the Birds", "Ignition Point!", "Lest We Remember" (novelette), "Saving Humanity" (Azazel series), "Neither Brute Nor Human" (Black Widowers series), "The Fourth Homonym" (Black Widowers series), "The Eye of the Beholder" (Azazel series), "The Quiet Place" (Black Widowers series), "I Love Little Pussy" (Azazel series)
- Asimov, Isaac (1990). Robot Visions. Penguin. ISBN 0-451-45064-7., collection of 11 short stories, 7 novelettes and 17 essays:
  "Introduction: The Robot Chronicles" (18-page introductory essay)
  Short stories: "Robot Visions", "Too Bad!", "Robbie", "Reason", "Liar!", "Runaround" (novelette), "Evidence" (novelette), "Little Lost Robot" (novelette), "The Evitable Conflict" (novelette), "Feminine Intuition" (novelette), "The Bicentennial Man" (novelette), "Someday" (Robot series, Multivac series), "Think!" (Robot series, Multivac series), "Segregationist", "Mirror Image" (Robot series #2.5), "Lenny", "Galley Slave" (novelette), "Christmas Without Rodney"
  Essays: "Robots I Have Known", "The New Teachers", "Whatever You Wish", "The Friends We Make", "Our Intelligent Tools", "The Machine and the Robot", "The Laws of Robotics", "The New Profession", "The Robot As Enemy?", "Intelligences Together", "My Robots", "The Laws of Humanics", "Cybernetic Organism", "The Sense of Humor", "Robots in Combination", "Future Fantastic"
- The Complete Stories:
  1. Volume 1 (1990), collection of 34 short stories, 10 novellas and 4 poems previously published in Earth Is Room Enough, Nine Tomorrows and Nightfall and Other Stories collections
  2. Volume 2 (1992), collection of 29 short stories and 11 novelettes previously published in other collections:
    "Not Final!" (Jovians series #1), "The Hazing" (Homo Sol series #3), "Death Sentence", "Blind Alley" (Galactic Empire series #4), "Evidence" (novelette, Robot series), "The Red Queen's Race" (novelette), "Day of the Hunters", "The Deep" (novelette), "The Martian Way" (novelette), "The Monkey's Finger", "The Singing Bell" (Wendell Urth series), "The Talking Stone" (Wendell Urth series), "Each an Explorer", "Let's Get Together" (Robot series), "Pâté de Foie Gras", "Galley Slave" (novelette, Robot series), "Lenny" (Robot series), "A Loint of Paw", "A Statue for Father", "Anniversary" (Multivac series, Brandon, Shea & Moore series #2), "Obituary", "Rain, Rain, Go Away", "Star Light", "Founding Father", "The Key" (novelette, Wendell Urth series), "The Billiard Ball" (novelette), "Exile to Hell", "Key Item" (Multivac series), "Feminine Intuition" (novelette, Robot series), "The Greatest Asset", "Mirror Image" (Robot series #2.5), "Take a Match", "Light Verse" (Robot series), "Stranger In Paradise" (novelette, Robot series), ". . . That Thou Art Mindful of Him" (novelette, Robot series), "The Life and Times of Multivac " (Multivac series), "The Bicentennial Man" (novelette, Robot series), "Marching In", "Old-fashioned", "The Tercentenary Incident" (Robot series)
- Asimov, Isaac (1995). Gold: The Final Science Fiction Collection. Random House Publishing. ISBN 0-553-28339-1., published posthumously collection of 12 short stories, 3 novelettes and 35 essays:
  1. "Part One: The Final Stories" (short stories and novelettes): "Cal" (novelette, Robot series), "Left to Right" (Probability Zero series), "Frustration", "Hallucination" (novelette, Multivac series), "The Instability", "Alexander the God", "In the Canyon", "Good-bye to Earth", "Battle-Hymn", "Feghoot and the Courts", "Fault-Intolerant", "Kid Brother" (Robot series), "The Nations in Space", "The Smile of the Chipper", "Gold" (novelette)
  2. "Part Two: On Science Fiction" (essays): "The Longest Voyage", "Inventing the Universe", "Flying Saucers and Science Fiction", "Invasion", "The Science Fiction Blowgun", "The Robot Chronicles", "Golden Age Ahead", "The All-Human Galaxy", "Psychohistory", "Science Fiction Series", "Survivors", "Nowhere!", "Outsiders, Insiders", "Science Fiction Anthologies", "The Influence of Science Fiction", "Women and Science Fiction", "Religion and Science Fiction", "Time-Travel"
  3. "Part Three: On Writing Science Fiction" (essays): "Plotting", "Metaphor", "Ideas", "Serials", "The Name of Our Field", "Hints", "Writing for Young People", "Names", "Originality", "Book Reviews", "What Writers Go Through", "Revisions", "Irony", "Plagiarism", "Symbolism", "Prediction", "Best-Seller", "Pseudonyms", "Dialog"
- Asimov, Isaac (1996). Magic. Voyager. ISBN 0-00-224622-8., published posthumously collection of 10 short stories, 1 novelette and 20 essays:
  1. "Part One: The Final Fantasy Stories" (short stories): "To Your Health" (Azazel series), "The Critic on the Hearth" (Azazel series), "It's a Job" (Azazel series), "Baby, It's Cold Outside" (Azazel series), "The Time Traveler" (Azazel series), "Wine Is a Mocker" (Azazel series), "The Mad Scientist" (Azazel series), "The Fable of the Three Princes" (novelette), "March Against the Foe" (Azazel series), "Northwestward" (Black Widowers series), "Prince Delightful and the Flameless Dragon"
  2. "Part Two: On Fantasy" (essays): "Magic", "Sword and Sorcery", "Concerning Tolkien", "In Days of Old", "Giants in the Earth", "When Fantasy Became Fantasy", "The Reluctant Critic", "The Unicorn", "Unknown", "Extraordinary Voyages", "Fairy Tales", "Dear Judy-Lynn", "Fantasy"
  3. "Part Three: Beyond Fantasy" (essays): "Reading and Writing", "The Right Answer", "Ignorance in America", "Knock Plastic!", "Lost in Non-Translation", "Look Long Upon a Monkey", "Thinking About Thinking"

Uncollected short stories:

- "The Weapon" (1942), as H.B. Ogden
- "The Micropsychiatric Applications of Thiotimoline" (1953), Thiotimoline series #2
- "Question" (1955), Multivac series
- "The Portable Star" (1955)
- "A Woman's Heart" (1957)
- "The Covenant" (1960), five-part round-robin story to which five different authors contributed (Poul Anderson, Isaac Asimov, Robert Sheckley, Murray Leinster, Robert Bloch)
- "The Man Who Made the 21st Century" (1965)
- "The Holmes-Ginsbook Device" (1968)
- "The Best New Thing (1971)
- "Big Game" (1974)
- "Half-Baked Publisher's Delight (1974), with Jeffrey S. Hudson
- "The Heavenly Host" (1974)
- "Party by Satellite", or "The Third Dream" (1974), Dream series #3
- "Strike!" (1979)
- "The Super Runner" (1982)
- "The Ten-Second Election" (1984)
- "Left to Right, and Beyond" (1987), with Harrison Roth, Probability Zero series
- "The Turning Point" (1988)

== Mysteries ==
=== Novels ===
- The Death Dealers (1958), republished as A Whiff of Death
- Murder at the ABA (1976), also published as Authorized Murder

=== Short stories ===
Collections:

- Asimov's Mysteries. 1968., collection of 11 short stories and 3 novelettes:
  "The Singing Bell" (Wendell Urth series), "The Talking Stone" (Wendell Urth series), "What's in a Name?", "The Dying Night" (novelette, Wendell Urth series), "Pâté de Foie Gras", "The Dust of Death", "A Loint of Paw", "I'm in Marsport Without Hilda", "Marooned off Vesta" (Brandon, Shea & Moore series #1), "Anniversary" (Multivac series, Brandon, Shea & Moore series #2), "Obituary", "Star Light", "The Key" (novelette, Wendell Urth series), "The Billiard Ball" (novelette)
- Black Widowers series:
  1. Tales of the Black Widowers. 1974., collection of 12 short stories:
    "The Acquisitive Chuckle", "Ph as in Phony", "Truth to Tell", "Go, Little Book!", "Early Sunday Morning", "The Obvious Factor", "The Pointing Finger", "Miss What?", "The Lullaby of Broadway", "Yankee Doodle Went to Town", "The Curious Omission", "Out of Sight"
  2. More Tales of the Black Widowers. 1976., collection of 12 short stories:
    "When No Man Pursueth", "Quicker Than the Eye", "The Iron Gem", "The Three Numbers", "Nothing Like Murder", "No Smoking", "Season's Greetings!", "The One and Only East", "Earthset and Evening Star", "Friday the Thirteenth", "The Unabridged", "The Ultimate Crime"
  3. Casebook of the Black Widowers. 1980., collection of 12 short stories:
    "The Cross of Lorraine", "The Family Man", "The Sports Page", "Second Best", "The Missing Item", "The Next Day", "Irrelevance!", "None So Blind", "The Backward Look", "What Time Is It?", "Middle Name", "To the Barest"
  4. Banquets of the Black Widowers. 1984., collection of 12 short stories:
    "Sixty Million Trillion Combinations", "The Woman in the Bar", "The Driver", "The Good Samaritan", "The Year of the Action", "Can You Prove It?", "The Phoenician Bauble", "A Monday in April", "Neither Brute Nor Human", "The Redhead", "The Wrong House", "The Intrusion"
  5. Puzzles of the Black Widowers. 1990., collection of 12 short stories:
    "The Fourth Homonym", "Unique Is Where You Find It", "The Lucky Piece", "Triple Devil", "Sunset on the Water", "Where Is He?", "The Old Purse", "The Quiet Place", "The Four-Leaf Clover", "The Envelope", "The Alibi", "The Recipe"
  6. The Return of the Black Widowers. 2003., published posthumously collection of 19 short stories (2 are by other authors):
    "The Acquisitive Chuckle", "Ph As in Phony", "Early Sunday Morning", "The Obvious Factor", "The Iron Gem", "To the Barest", "Sixty Million Trillion Combinations", "The Redhead", "The Wrong House", "Triple Devil", "The Men Who Read Isaac Asimov" (by William Brittain), "Northwestward", "Yes, but Why?", "Lost in a Space Warp", "Police at the Door", "The Haunted Cabin", "The Guest's Guest", "The Woman in the Bar", "The Last Story" (by Charles Ardai)
- Larry Mysteries (young adult) series:
  1. The Key Word and Other Mysteries. 1977., collection of 6 short stories:
    "The Key Word", "Santa Claus Gets a Coin", "Sarah Tops", "The Thirteenth Day of Christmas", "A Case of Need", "The Disappearing Man" (only in UK edition)
  2. The Disappearing Man and Other Mysteries. 1985., collection of 5 short stories:
    "The Disappearing Man", "Lucky Seven", "The Christmas Solution", "The Twins", "The Man in the Park"
- The Union Club Mysteries. 1983., collection of 30 short stories from Union Club Mysteries series:
  "No Refuge Could Save", "The Telephone Number", "The Men Who Wouldn't Talk", "A Clear Shot", "Irresistible to Women", "He Wasn't There", "The Thin Line", "Mystery Tune", "Hide and Seek", "Gift", "Hot or Cold", "The Thirteenth Page", "1 to 999", "Twelve Years Old", "Testing, Testing!", "The Appleby Story", "Dollars and Cents", "Friends and Allies", "Which is Which?", "The Sign", "Catching the Fox", "Getting the Combination", "The Library Book", "The Three Goblets", "Spell It!", "Two Women", "Sending a Signal", "The Favorite Piece", "Half a Ghost", "There Was a Young Lady"
- The Best Mysteries of Isaac Asimov. 1986., collection of 30 short stories and 1 novelette;
  Black Widowers series: "The Obvious Factor", "The Pointing Finger", "Out of Sight", "Yankee Doodle Went to Town", "Quicker Than the Eye", "The Three Numbers", "The One and Only East", "The Cross of Lorraine", "The Next Day", "What Time Is It?", "Middle Name", "Sixty Million Trillion Combinations", "The Good Samaritan", "Can You Prove It?", "The Redhead"
  Union Club Mysteries series: "He Wasn't There", "Hide and Seek", "Dollars and Cents", "The Sign", "Getting the Combination", "The Library Book", "Never Out of Sight", "The Magic Umbrella", "The Speck"
  Others: "The Key" (novelette, Wendell Urth series), "A Problem of Numbers", "The Little Things", "Halloween", "The Thirteenth Day of Christmas" (Larry Mysteries series), "The Key Word" (Larry Mysteries series), "Nothing Might Happen"

Uncollected short stories:

- "Getting Even" (1980), Azazel series, Union Club Mysteries series
- "Zip Code" (1986), Larry Mysteries series
- "State Capital", or "A Chemical Solution" (1983), Union Club Mysteries series
- "The Bird That Sang Bass", or "Riddled With Clues" (1983), Union Club Mysteries series
- "The Briefcase in the Taxi", or "Circuit Breaker" (1983), Union Club Mysteries series
- "The Last Caesar", or "Great Caesar's Ghost" (1983), Union Club Mysteries series
- "The Queen and King" (1984), Union Club Mysteries series
- "The Year of the Feast" (1984), Union Club Mysteries series
- "Triply Unique" (1984), Union Club Mysteries series
- "Straight Lines" (1985), Union Club Mysteries series
- "The Suspect", or "The Taunter" (1985), Union Club Mysteries series
- "Upside Down" (1985), Union Club Mysteries series
- "Child's Play" (1986), Union Club Mysteries series
- "New England Equinox" (1986), Union Club Mysteries series
- "Ten" (1986), Union Club Mysteries series
- "The Common Name" (1986), Union Club Mysteries series
- "The Stamp" (1987), Union Club Mysteries series
- "The Teddy Bear" (1987), Union Club Mysteries series
- "The Legacy" (1988), Union Club Mysteries series
- "The Lost Dog" (1988), Union Club Mysteries series
- "Ho! Ho! Ho!" (1989), Union Club Mysteries series
- "The Last Man" (1989), Union Club Mysteries series
- "Missing", or "A Safe Place" (1991), Union Club Mysteries series

== Comics ==
- Star Empire (1990), comic strip

== Plays ==
- The Story Machine (1958), based in Asimov short story "Someday"

== Poems ==
Collections:

- Lecherous Limericks series:
  1. Lecherous Limericks (1975), ISBN 0-449-22841-X, collection of 100 poems:
    "Darkest before dawn", "Frustration", "Independence", "The dangers of drink", "Look, everybody!", "The last straw", "Cops are human, too", "Retribution", "Don't back out now", "Conveneent in a pinch", "Overdoing it", "Modesty victorious", "No time out", "Reward of industry", "Shocking!", "A poor example", "The classic", "A good move", "Ah, those sensitive fingers", "How awful", "Compensation", "Side effect", "A la freud", "Don't breathe", "What a shame!", "Fit for his work", "The cost of ignorance", "The prospective widow", "The stars and stripes forever", "Forethought", "Music lover", "Too bad", "Slow but sure", "Valedictorian", "Ouch!", "Law abiding", "Let's see now", "Therapeutic effect", "Yo heave ho", "One has one's pride", "Heh, heh", "Ooh, la, la", "Pleasant surprise", "Zoological comparison", "Oh, that screaming", "Indecision", "Huh?", "Wagnerian", "Either way", "Hold tight!", "It's only fitting", "More than one way", "Following orders", "Unwieldy", "Disillusionment", "Heartbreak!", "All in a night's work", "Asymmetry", "Reciprocity", "Better than nothing", "Nothing personal", "Next!", "All is not lost", "The economic facts", "Woman's prerogative", "Not foiled!", "Retirement!", "No, it won't", "Age cannot wither", "Well, hardly ever", "Male chauvinist pig", "Too good to use", "Disillusionment", "Watch out behind you", "Now we'll never know", "Never say die", "Scarcely worth it", "Bravo!", "Like this, please", "Making beautiful music", "That's the big dipper, my dear", "No safety in numbers", "Last laugh", "Now hear this!", "Insult added to injury", "Each to his taste", "A natural mistake", "Impatience", "Change of life", "Naturally!", "High standards", "Whatever do you mean?", "For a change", "Nonfunctional", "Too good", "Faster, faster!", "Truth in advertising", "The good doctor", "Order of increasing importance", "And, finally"
  2. More Lecherous Limericks (1976), ISBN 0-8027-7102-5, collection of 100 poems
  3. Still More Lecherous Limericks (1977), ISBN 0-8027-7106-8, collection of 100 poems:
    "Keep it Up", "Ouch!", "Definition", "The Hard Way", "Hubris", "A Woman's Work", "Idiot!", "Entertainment", "Braggart", "These College Girls", "Only Reasonable", "More Than One Way", "No Hurry", "Inept", "You Did?", "About Time", "Ugly!", "Don't Be Too Sure", "What an Improvement!", "Reasons Enough", "Practical", "To Each His Own", "Reminiscences", "Waste of Time", "Demand", "One More Notch", "Cheapskate", "What Were You Saying?", "Education", "Shame!", "Up-Up-", "Down with Virtue!", "Specialized", "No Favorites", "Silver Lining", "Season's Greetings", "Afraid of the Dark", "Unfeeling", "Exchange Problems", "Not Worth the Trouble", "Next to Godliness", "Ethnic", "No Accounting For Tastes", "Screwples", "Effective", "Bravo!", "Better Than Nothint", "The Better Alternative", "To Each Her Own", "Foreplay", "Opportunist", "Economics", "Nonchalance", "Division of Labor", "Drawing the Line", "Grammar", "Unreasonable", "Self-Defeating", "The Male Dream", "Big Mouth", "Disadvantage", "Well, Give In!", "All Talk", "Consequence", "Naughty-Cal", "Stud", "Shortchanged", "Liberal Thinking", "That'll Teach Her", "Compliance", "Weakling", "Poverty", "Emily Post", "Incredible", "Compensation", "Christmas Spirit", "Russian One", "Russian Two", "Russian Three", "Strategy", "The Ayes Have It", "Plural", "Gotcha", "One Way", "It's Not What You Think", "Don't Stop", "Too Late", "Melting", "It's Only Their Duty", "Celibacy", "Don't Miss!", "Safety First", "Repetition", "Practical", "Commencement", "Worthy of Her Hire", "You Never Lose It", "Calisthenics", "Loan", "July 4, 1976"
- Asimov's Sherlockian Limericks (1978), ISBN 978-0892960392, collection of 60 poems:
  'A Study in Scarlet", "The Sign of the Four", "A Scandal in Bohemia", "The Red-Headed League", "A Case of Identity", "The Boscombe Valley Mystery", "The Five Orange Pips", "The Man with the Twisted Lip", "The Adventure of the Blue Carbuncle", "The Adventure of the Speckled Band", "The Adventure of the Engineer's Thumb", "The Adventure of the Noble Bachelor", "The Adventure of the Beryl Coronet", "The Adventure of the Copper Beeches", "Silver Blaze", "The Yellow Face", "The Stockbroker's Clerk", "The 'Gloria Scott'", "The Musgrave Ritual", "The Reigate Squires", "The Crooked Man", "The Resident Patient", "The Greek Interpreter", "The Naval Treaty", "The Final Problem", "The Hound of the Baskervilles", "The Adventure of the Empty House", "The Adventure of the Norwood Builder", "The Adventure of the Dancing Men", "The Adventure of the Solitary Cyclist", "The Priory School", "The Adventure of Black Peter", "The Adventure of Charles Augustus Milverton", "The Adventure of the Six Napoleons", "The Three Students", "The Golden Pince-Nez", "The Adventure of the Missing Three-Quarter", "The Adventure of the Abbey Grange", "The Adventure of the Second Stain", "The Valley of Fear", "The Adventure of Wisteria Lodge", "The Adventure of the Cardboard Box", "The Adventure of the Red Circle", "The Adventure of the Bruce-Partington Plans", "The Adventure of the Dying Detective", "The Disappearance of Lady Frances Carfax", "The Adventure of the Devil's Foot", "His Last Bow", "The Adventure of the Illustrious Client", "The Adventure of the Blanched Soldier", "The Adventure of the Mazarin Stone", "The Adventure of the Three Gables", "The Adventure of the Sussex Vampire", "The Adventure of the Three Garridebs", "The Problem of Thor Bridge", "The Creeping Man", "The Adventure of the Lion's Mane", "The Adventure of the Veiled Lodger", "The Adventure of Shoscombe Old Place", "The Adventure of the Retired Colourman"
- Limericks: Two Gross series:
  1. Limericks: Two Gross, or Two Dozen Dirty Dozen Stanzas (1978), with John Ciardi, ISBN 0-393-04530-7, collection of 299 poems
  2. A Grossery of Limericks (1981), with John Ciardi, ISBN 0-393-33112-1, collection of 288 poems
- Isaac Asimov's Limericks for Children (1984), ISBN 978-0898452396, collection of 48 poems

Uncollected poems:

- "The Foundation of Science Fiction Success", or "The Foundation of S.F. Success" (1954)
- "How to Succeed at Science Fiction Without Really Trying" (1956)
- "In Reply to Randall Garrett" (1956)
- "Tale of the Pioneer" (1957)
- "The Author's Ordeal" (1957)
- "I Just Make Them Up, See!" (1958)
- "Oh, That Lost Sense of Wonder!" (1958)
- "The Thunder-Thieves", or "It's All How You Look at It" (1958)
- "Rejection Slips" (1959)
- "The Prime of Life" (1966)
- "Shutting the Barn Door" (1976)
- "You Mean" (1976)
- "Science Fiction Convention" (1977)
- "A Fuller Explanation of Original Sin" (1982), with Janet Asimov as Janet O. Jeppson
- "The One Thing Lacking" (1982)
- "Phosgene" (1984)
- "Potassium Cyanide" (1984)
- "Snake Venom" (1984)
- "Strychnine" (1984)
- "The Gilbert and Sullivan Enthusiasts" (1991)

== Non-fiction ==
=== General science ===
- Words of Science and the History Behind Them (1959) ISBN 978-0-395-06571-6
- Breakthroughs in Science series:
  1. Breakthroughs in Science (1959) ISBN 978-0-395-06561-7
  2. Great Ideas of Science (1969)
- The Intelligent Man's Guide to Science (1960)
  Revised versions were published as The New Intelligent Man's Guide to Science (1965), Asimov's Guide to Science (1972), and Asimov's New Guide to Science (1984) ISBN 978-0-14-017213-3
- Asimov's Biographical Encyclopedia of Science and Technology (1964)
  2nd Edition, 1972; 3rd Edition, 1983
- Twentieth Century Discovery (1969)
- More Words of Science (1972)
- Ginn Science Collection (children's textbooks):
  1. Ginn Science Program, Intermediate Level A (1972)
  2. Ginn Science Program, Intermediate Level B (1972)
  3. Ginn Science Program, Intermediate Level C (1972)
  4. Ginn Science Program, Advanced Level A (1973)
  5. Ginn Science Program, Advanced Level B (1973)
- Please Explain (1973) ISBN 978-0-440-96804-7
- A Choice of Catastrophes (1979)
- Exploring the Earth and the Cosmos (1982) ISBN 978-0-517-54667-3
- The Measure of the Universe (1983)
- Asimov's Chronology of Science and Discovery (1989), second edition adds content through 1993, ISBN 978-0-06-270113-8
- Is Our Planet Warming Up? (1991)
- Our Angry Earth: A Ticking Ecological Bomb (1991), with Frederik Pohl ISBN 0-312-85252-5
- What Causes Acid Rain (1991)
- Where Does Garbage Go? (1991)
- Why Are Whales Vanishing? (1991)
- Why is the Air Dirty? (1991)
- Why Do We Have Different Seasons? (1991)
- What's Happening to the Ozone Layer? (1992)
- Why Are Animals Endangered? (1992)
- Why Are Some Beaches Oily? (1992)
- Why Are the Rain Forests Vanishing? (1992)
- Why Does Litter Cause Problems? (1992)

Collections of essays:

- Only a Trillion (1957) ISBN 978-0-441-63121-6
- Published in Magazine of Fantasy and Science Fiction – originally published as monthly columns
  1. Fact and Fancy (1962)
  2. View from a Height (1963)
  3. Adding a Dimension (1964)
  4. Of Time and Space and Other Things (1965)
  5. From Earth to Heaven (1966)
  6. Science, Numbers, and I (1968)
  7. The Solar System and Back (1970)
  8. The Stars in their Courses (1971)
  9. The Left Hand of the Electron (1972)
  10. The Tragedy of the Moon (1973)
  11. Asimov on Astronomy (1974), updated version of essays in previous collections ISBN 978-0-517-27924-3
  12. Asimov on Chemistry (1974), updated version of essays in previous collections
  13. Of Matters Great and Small (1975)
  14. Asimov on Physics (1976), updated version of essays in previous collections ISBN 978-0-385-00958-4
  15. The Planet That Wasn't (1976)
  16. Asimov on Numbers (1976), updated version of essays in previous collections
  17. Quasar, Quasar, Burning Bright (1978)
  18. The Road to Infinity (1979)
  19. The Sun Shines Bright (1981)
  20. Counting the Eons (1983)
  21. X Stands for Unknown (1984)
  22. The Subatomic Monster (1985)
  23. Far as Human Eye Could See: Essays on Science (1987)
  24. Beginnings: The Story of Origins of Mankind, Life, the Earth, the Universe (1987)
  25. The Relativity of Wrong (1988)
  26. Asimov on Science: A 30 Year Retrospective 1959–1989 (1989), features the first essay in the introduction
  27. Out of the Everywhere (1990)
  28. The Secret of the Universe (1991)
- Is Anyone There? (1967), ISBN 0-385-08401-3 – where he used the term Spome
- Today and Tomorrow and... (1973)
- Science Past, Science Future (1975) ISBN 978-0-385-09923-3
- The Beginning and the End (1977)
- Life and Time (1978)
- The Threats of Our World (1979)
- Change!: Seventy-one Glimpses of the Future (1979)
- The Roving Mind (1983). New edition published by Prometheus Books, 1997, ISBN 1-57392-181-5
- The Dangers of Intelligence and Other Science Essays (1986)
- Past, Present, and Future (1987)
- The Tyrannosaurus Prescription: and One Hundred Other Science Essays (1989)
- Frontiers series:
  1. Frontiers: New Discoveries About Man and His Planet, Outer Space and the Universe (1990)
  2. Frontiers II: More Recent Discoveries About Life, Earth, Space, and the Universe (1993), with Janet Asimov, published posthumously

=== Science fiction ===
Collections of essays:

- Asimov on Science Fiction (1981)
- Asimov's Galaxy: Reflections on Science Fiction (1989)

=== Astronomy ===
- The Clock We Live On (1959) ISBN 978-0-200-71100-5
- Satellites in Outer Space (1960)
- The Double Planet (1960)
- The Kingdom of the Sun (1960) ISBN 978-0020912507
- Planets for Man (1964), with Stephen H. Dole
  reprinted by RAND, 2007, ISBN 978-0-8330-4226-2
- The Universe: From Flat Earth to Quasar (1966) ISBN 978-0-380-01596-2
  2nd edition (1971); 3rd edition as The Universe: From Flat Earth to Black Holes and Beyond (1980)
- Environments Out There (1967)
- Mars (1967)
- The Moon (1967)
- To The Ends of the Universe (1967)
- Galaxies (1968)
- Stars (1968)
- ABC's of Space (1969)
- What Makes the Sun Shine (1971)
- Comets and Meteors (1973)
- Jupiter, the Largest Planet (1973)
- The Sun (1973)
- Asimov on Astronomy (1974)
- Our World in Space (1974) ISBN 978-0-8212-0434-4
- Eyes on the Universe: A History of the Telescope (1975)
- The Solar System (1975)
- Alpha Centauri, the Nearest Star (1976)
- Mars, the Red Planet (1977)
- The Collapsing Universe (1977) ISBN 0-671-81738-8
- Extraterrestrial Civilizations (1979) ISBN 978-0-449-90020-8
- Saturn and beyond (1979)
- Venus, Near Neighbor of the Sun (1981)
- Visions of the Universe (1981) with co-author Kazuaki Iwasaki ISBN 978-0-939540-01-3
- Asimov's Guide to Halley's Comet (1985)
- The Exploding Suns: The Secrets of the Supernovas (1985)
- Isaac Asimov's Library of the Universe series:
  1. Ancient Astronomy (1988)
  2. The Solar System series:
    1. The Asteroids, or Cosmic Debris: The Asteroids (1988)
    2. Mercury, or Mercury: The Quick Planet, or Nearest the Sun: The Planet Mercury (1989)
    3. Saturn, or Saturn: The Ringed Beauty, or The Ringed Planet: Saturn (1989)
    4. Earth, or Earth: Our Home Base, or Our Planet Earth (1988) ISBN 978-1-59102-177-3
    5. The Moon, or The Earth's Moon (1988) ISBN 978-1-59102-123-0
    6. The Sun, or The Sun and Its Secrets (1988) ISBN 978-1-59102-122-3
    7. Jupiter, or Jupiter: The Spotted Giant, or Planet of Extremes: Jupiter (1989)
    8. Neptune, or Neptune: The Farthest Giant, or A Distant Giant: The Planet Neptune (1990)
    9. Uranus, or Uranus: The Sideways Planet, or A Distant Puzzle: The Planet Uranus (1988)
    10. Mars, or Mars: Our Mysterious Neighbor, or The Red Planet: Mars (1988)
    11. Pluto and Charon, or Pluto: A Double Planet?, or A Double Planet?: Pluto and Charon (1989)
    12. Venus, or Venus: A Shrouded Mystery, or Earth's Twin? The Planet Venus (1990) ISBN 978-0-8368-3877-0
    all revised by Richard Hantula
  3. Astronomy Today (1989)
  4. The Birth and Death of Stars (1989)
  5. Colonizing the Planets and the Stars (1989)
  6. Comets and Meteors (1989)
  7. Did Comets Kill the Dinosaurs? (1987)
  8. The Future in Space (1993), with Greg Walz-Chojnacki, published posthumously
  9. How Was the Universe Born? (1988)
  10. Is There Life on Other Planets? (1989)
  11. Mythology and the Universe (1989)
  12. Our Milky Way and Other Galaxies (1988)
  13. Our Solar System (1988)
  14. Piloted Space Flights (1989)
  15. Quasars, Pulsars, and Black Holes, or Black Holes, Pulsars and Quasars, or Mysteries of deep space: Quasars, Pulsars and Black Holes (1988) ISBN 978-0-8368-1133-9
  16. Rockets, Probes, and Satellites (1988)
  17. Science Fiction, Science Fact (1989)
  18. Space Garbage (1989)
  19. The Space Spotter's Guide (1988)
  20. Unidentified Flying Objects (1988)
  21. The World's Space Programs (1990)
- Think About Space: Where Have We Been and Where Are We Going? (1989), with co-author Frank White
- Isaac Asimov's Guide to Earth and Space (1991) ISBN 978-0-449-22059-7
- What Is a Shooting Star? (1991)
- What Is an Eclipse? (1991)
- Why Do Stars Twinkle? (1991)
- Why Does the Moon Change Shape? (1991)

=== Geoscience ===
- Words on the Map (1962)
- ABC's of the Ocean (1970)
- ABC's of the Earth (1971)
- The Ends of the Earth: The Polar Regions of the World (1975)

=== Mathematics ===
- Realm of Numbers (1959) ISBN 978-0-395-06566-2
- Realm of Measure (1960)
- Realm of Algebra (1961)
- Quick and Easy Math (1964)
- An Easy Introduction to the Slide Rule (1965) ISBN 9780395065754
- The History of Mathematics (1989), chart

=== Physics ===
- Inside the Atom (1956) ISBN 978-0-200-71444-0
- The Neutrino (1966) ASIN B002JK525W
- Understanding Physics:
  1. Vol. I, Motion, Sound, and Heat (1966) ISBN 978-0-451-00329-4
  2. Vol. II, Light, Magnetism, and Electricity (1966) ISBN 978-0-451-61942-6
  3. Vol. III, The Electron, Proton, and Neutron (1966) ISBN 978-0-451-62634-9
- Light (1970)
- Electricity and Man (1972)
- World Within Worlds (1972)
- Robots: Machines In Man's Image (1985), with Karen Frenklen
- Atom: Journey Across the Subatomic Cosmos (1991) ISBN 978-1-4395-0900-5

=== Chemistry ===
- Biochemistry and Human Metabolism (1952)
- The Chemicals of Life: Enzymes, Vitamins, and Hormones (1954) ISBN 978-0-451-62418-5
- Chemistry and Human Health (1956)
- Building Blocks of the Universe (1957; revised 1974) ISBN 0-200-71099-0 ISBN 978-0-200-71099-2
- The World of Carbon (1958) ISBN 978-0-02-091350-4
- The World of Nitrogen (1958) ISBN 978-0-02-091400-6
- Life and Energy (1962) ISBN 978-0-380-00942-8
- The Search for the Elements (1962)
- The Genetic Code (1963) ISBN 978-0451621108
- A Short History of Chemistry (1965)
- The Genetic Effects of Radiation (1966), with Theodosius Dobzhansky
- The Noble Gases (1966)
- Photosynthesis (1969) ISBN 978-0-465-05703-0
- The History of Chemistry (1991), chart

=== Biology ===
- Races and People (1955), co-written with William C. Boyd, illustrations by John Bradford
- The Living River (1960), book on hematology
- The Wellsprings of Life (1960) ISBN 978-0-451-03245-4
- The Human Body: Its Structure and Operation (1963) ISBN 978-0-451-02430-5, ISBN 978-0-451-62707-0 (revised)
- The Human Brain: Its Capacities and Functions (1963) ISBN 978-0-451-62867-1
- A Short History of Biology (1964)
- ABC's of Ecology (1972)
- The History of Biology (1988), chart
- Little Library of Dinosaurs (1989), five volumes

=== History ===
- The Kite That Won the Revolution (1963) ISBN 0-395-06560-7
- Universal History Asimov series:
  1. The Near East: 10,000 Years of History (1968)
  2. The Land of Canaan (1971)
  3. The Egyptians (1967)
  4. The Greeks: A Great Adventure (1965)
  5. The Roman Republic (1966)
  6. The Roman Empire (1967)
  7. Constantinople: The Forgotten Empire (1970)
  8. The Dark Ages (1968)
  9. The Shaping of England (1969)
  10. The Shaping of France (1972)
  11. The Shaping of North America: From Earliest Times to 1763 (1973)
  12. The Birth of the United States: 1763–1816 (1974)
  13. Our Federal Union: The United States from 1816 to 1865 (1975), ISBN 0-395-20283-3
  14. The Golden Door: The United States From 1865 to 1918 (1977)
- Words from History (1968)
- Earth: Our Crowded Spaceship (1974)
- The March of the Millennia: A Key to Looking at History (1990), with Frank White
- Asimov's Chronology of the World: The History of the World From the Big Bang to Modern Times (1991) ISBN 978-0-06-270036-0
- Isaac Asimov's Pioneers of Science and Exploration series:
  1. Christopher Columbus: Navigator to the New World (1991)
  2. Ferdinand Magellan: Opening the Door to World Exploration (1991)
  3. Henry Hudson: Arctic Explorer and North American Adventurer (1991)

=== The Bible ===
- Words in Genesis (1962)
- Words from the Exodus (1963)
- Asimov's Guide to the Bible, vols I and II (1968 and 1969, one-volume ed. 1981) ISBN 0-517-34582-X
- The Story of Ruth (1972) ISBN 0-385-08594-X
- Animals of the Bible (1978)
- In the Beginning: Science Faces God in the Book of Genesis (1981)

=== Literature ===
- Words from the Myths (1961)
- Asimov's Guide to Shakespeare, vols I and II (1970), ISBN 0-517-26825-6
- How to Enjoy Writing: A Book of Aid and Comfort (1987), with Janet Asimov
- Asimov's Annotated "Don Juan" (1972)
- Asimov's Annotated "Paradise Lost"
- Familiar Poems, Annotated (1976)
- Asimov's The Annotated "Gulliver's Travels" (1980)
- Asimov's Annotated "Gilbert and Sullivan" (1988)

=== Guides ===
- How Did We Find Out series:
  1. How Did We Find Out the Earth is Round? (1973)
  2. How Did We Find Out About Electricity? (1973)
  3. How Did We Find Out About Numbers? (1973)
  4. How Did We Find Out About Dinosaurs? (1973)
  5. How Did We Find Out About Germs? (1974)
  6. How Did We Find Out About Vitamins? (1974)
  7. How Did We Find Out About Comets? (1975)
  8. How Did We Find Out About Energy? (1975)
  9. How Did We Find Out About Atoms? (1976)
  10. How Did We Find Out About Nuclear Power? (1976)
  11. How Did We Find Out About Outer Space? (1977)
  12. How Did We Find Out About Earthquakes? (1978)
  13. How Did We Find Out About Black Holes? (1978)
  14. How Did We Find Out About Our Human Roots? (1979)
  15. How Did We Find Out About Antarctica? (1979)
  16. How Did We Find Out About Oil? (1980)
  17. How Did We Find Out About Coal? (1980)
  18. How Did We Find Out About Solar Power? (1981)
  19. How Did We Find Out About Volcanoes? (1981)
  20. How Did We Find Out About Life in the Deep Sea? (1982)
  21. How Did We Find Out About the Beginning of Life? (1982)
  22. How Did We Find Out About the Universe? (1982)
  23. How Did We Find Out About Genes? (1983)
  24. How Did We Find Out About Computers? (1984)
  25. How Did We Find Out About Robots? (1984)
  26. How Did We Find Out About the Atmosphere? (1985)
  27. How Did We Find Out About DNA? (1985)
  28. How Did We Find Out About the Speed of Light? (1986)
  29. How Did We Find Out About Blood? (1987)
  30. How Did We Find Out About Sunshine? (1987)
  31. How Did We Find Out About the Brain? (1987)
  32. How Did We Find Out About Superconductivity? (1988)
  33. How Did We Find Out About Microwaves? (1989)
  34. How Did We Find Out About Photosynthesis? (1989)
  35. How Did We Find Out About Lasers? (1990)
  36. How Did We Find Out About Neptune? (1990)
  37. How Did We Find Out About Pluto? (1991)
- The Complete Science Fair Handbooks (1989), with Anthony D. Fredericks

=== Humor ===
- Isaac Asimov's Treasury of Humor (1971)
- The Sensuous Dirty Old Man (1971), as Dr. A ISBN 0-451-07199-9
- Asimov Laughs Again: More Than 700 Favorite Jokes, Limericks, and Anecdotes (1992)

=== Autobiographies ===
- The Autobiography of Isaac Asimov:
  1. In Memory Yet Green: The Autobiography of Isaac Asimov, 1920–1954 (1979, Doubleday)
  2. In Joy Still Felt: The Autobiography of Isaac Asimov, 1954–1978 (1980, Doubleday)
- I. Asimov: A Memoir (1994, Doubleday), published posthumously
- Yours, Isaac Asimov (1995), published posthumously
- It's Been a Good Life (2002, Prometheus Books), published posthumously, condensation of Asimov's three-volume biography edited by his widow, Janet Asimov

=== Miscellanies ===
- Opus series (Wide-ranging collections issued to celebrate the publication of Asimov's 100th, 200th and 300th books):
  1. Opus 100 (1969), ISBN 0-395-07351-0
  2. Opus 200 (1979), ISBN 0-395-27625-X
  3. Opus 300 (1984), ISBN 0-395-36108-7
- Living in the Future (1975)
- Isaac Asimov's Book of Facts) (1979), ISBN 0-517-36111-6
- Isaac Asimov Presents Superquiz series:
  1. Isaac Asimov Presents Superquiz (1982)
  2. Isaac Asimov Presents Superquiz II (1983)
  3. Isaac Asimov Presents Superquiz III (1987)
  4. Isaac Asimov Presents Superquiz IV (1989)
- Futuredays: A Nineteenth-Century Vision of the Year 2000 (1986)

== See also ==
- Isaac Asimov bibliography (chronological)
- Isaac Asimov bibliography (alphabetical)
