= Lucky Starr and the Moons of Jupiter =

1957 novel by Isaac Asimov

- Cover of the first edition
- Author: Isaac Asimov
- Illustrator: Albert Orbaan
- Cover artist: Darrell K. Sweet
- Language: English
- Series: Lucky Starr series
- Genre: Science fiction
- Publisher: Doubleday & Company
- Publication date: August 1957
- Publication place: United States
- Media type: Print (hardcover and paperback)
- Pages: 192
- Preceded by: Lucky Starr and the Big Sun of Mercury
- Followed by: Lucky Starr and the Rings of Saturn

Lucky Starr and the Moons of Jupiter is the fifth novel in the Lucky Starr series, six juvenile science fiction novels by Isaac Asimov that originally appeared under the pseudonym Paul French. The novel was first published by Doubleday & Company in August 1957. It is the only novel by Asimov set in the Jovian system.

== Setting ==
Lucky Starr and the Moons of Jupiter takes place in the Jovian system. In the mid-1950s, when the novel was written, Jupiter had twelve known satellites. The first half of the novel takes place on what was then the outermost known satellite, Jupiter IX, discovered by Seth Barnes Nicholson in 1914. Jupiter IX had been given the unofficial name 'Hades' in 1955, but in the novel Asimov mistakenly refers to it as Adrastea, which was the unofficial name of Jupiter XII. The confusion doubtless arose from the fact that Jupiter IX was the twelfth farthest known satellite, while Jupiter XII was the ninth farthest known satellite. In 1975, the International Astronomical Union gave Jupiter IX the official name Sinope. Asimov describes Jupiter IX as being 89 miles in diameter, but its diameter is now thought to be only 23 miles.

Part of the novel is also set on Io, the innermost of the Galilean moons. Io is depicted as having a thin atmosphere of methane, and fields of ammonia snow and ice, as well as rivers of liquid ammonia.

== Plot summary ==
For six years, Jupiter IX has been the site of a secret project to develop an antigravity, or Agrav, space drive; but the Council of Science learns that information from the project is released to the enemy Sirians. A month after returning from Mercury, protagonists David "Lucky" Starr and John Bigman Jones are sent to Jupiter IX to investigate, bringing a V-frog to aid the investigation.

Upon reaching IX, Starr and Bigman are warned away by the head of the project, Commander Donahue, who argues the men on the project are angry at investigation and may threaten Starr's safety. Starr and Bigman land nevertheless, and are met by a large group of workers led by a man named Red Summers, who insists that Starr take part in a duel in an Agrav corridor against a much larger man called Big Armand. During the duel, Bigman realizes Summers is sabotaging Starr's Agrav harness and forces Summers to stop at gunpoint, whereupon Starr wins the duel and gains Big Armand's friendship.

At their quarters, Starr and Bigman are met by their neighbor, a blind man named Harry Norrich, who tells Starr that Summers is a convict on Earth, but has earned responsibility on the project, and is hostile to Starr for fear of having his past crimes revealed; whereas when Norrich's seeing-eye dog died, Summers obtained another, a German Shepherd named Mutt, and has done similar favors for other workers on the project. Starr assures Norrich that he has no intention of getting Summers in trouble for the duel.

The next morning someone kills the V-frog while both men are distracted; whereafter Starr and Bigman tell Donahue and James Panner, the chief engineer on the project, that because the V-frog telepathically induced affection in all whom it met, only a robot, immune to emotion, could have killed it. It is then suggested that the Sirians are using android spies throughout the Solar System.

Donahue, unconvinced, orders the launch of an Agrav ship, the Jovian Moon, to Io the following evening, and forbids Starr to conduct his investigation until after it returns. The Jovian Moon lifts off on schedule, its crew of seventeen including Donahue, Panner, Summers, Norrich, Mutt, Starr, and Bigman; the latter included because Starr believes the spy is on board.

On Io, Bigman falls into an ammonial river, and is rescued by Mutt. After lift-off from Io, the Agrav drive fails, leaving the Jovian Moon falling towards Jupiter. Starr manages to land the ship on Amalthea, where they find that Red Summers is missing. An investigation reveals that Summers tricked Norrich into reporting him present on the ship while he was still on Io, whereupon Starr realizes that the Sirians had two agents planted in the Agrav project: the still-hidden robot spy, and the Earthman traitor Summers.

Panner repairs the Agrav, and the Jovian Moon returns to Io, where Starr and Bigman locate Summers. Summers admits to working for the Sirians, but kills himself before revealing the identity of the robot spy. When Norrich helps bury Summers, Starr accuses him of being the robot, and Bigman threatens to shoot him; whereupon Mutt, coming to defend Norrich, is revealed as the robot himself.

With the exposure of Mutt, Starr discerns that the Sirian spy ring on Earth must be the people who supplied Summers with Mutt, and who may be giving canid robot spies to others on Earth, and sets out to prevent them.

== Reception ==
Galaxy's Floyd C. Gale reviewed the novel favorably, calling it the best of the Lucky Starr series and saying that Asimov "milks the situation for all its thrills, while painlessly imparting scientific lore and a code of ethics." Villiers Gerson, writing in The New York Times, declared it to be "well-written adventure".

== Themes ==
The introduction of the Sirians in Lucky Starr and the Pirates of the Asteroids marked the beginning of Asimov's transformation of the Lucky Starr series from the 'masked crimefighter' subgenre to the espionage subgenre. For the next two novels in the series, the Sirians served as a distraction from the real solution to the mystery; but in Rings of Saturn the Sirians are villains in fact. As with Lucky Starr and the Big Sun of Mercury, the Three Laws of Robotics plays a part in the novel, revealing Asimov as the true author, though for the sake of continuity the novel was published under the pseudonym 'Paul French'.

There are small inconsistencies between the various novels. In the first, Ganymede is mentioned as a settled world of the Solar System, although in later novels Ganymede has no permanent settlement, and has even served as the location of a secret Sirian base. The first man on Mars is named Wingrad in David Starr, Space Ranger, but is named Ching in Moons of Jupiter. The name of the state that rules the Solar System also changes from novel to novel. In Pirates of the Asteroids, it is the Terrestrial Empire; in Oceans of Venus, it is the Solar Confederation; in Big Sun of Mercury, it is the Terran Federation; and in Moons of Jupiter it is the Solar Federation of Worlds.
