= Of Ice and Men =

Of Ice and Men may refer to:

- "Of Ice and Men" (American Dad!), a 2006 television episode
- "Of Ice and Men" (Roseanne), a 1992 television episode
- Of Ice and Men, a 1982 book about the British Antarctic Survey, by Vivian Fuchs
- Of Ice and Men, a 2011 British television documentary with commentary by Huw Lewis-Jones
- "Of Ice and Men", a scientific essay by Isaac Asimov included in his 1978 collection Quasar, Quasar, Burning Bright
