= Lucky Starr and the Rings of Saturn =

1958 novel by Isaac Asimov

- Cover of the first edition
- Author: Isaac Asimov
- Cover artist: Albert Orbaan
- Language: English
- Series: Lucky Starr series
- Genre: Science fiction
- Publisher: Doubleday & Company
- Publication date: 1958
- Publication place: United States
- Media type: Print (hardback & paperback)
- Pages: 186 pp
- Preceded by: Lucky Starr and the Moons of Jupiter

Lucky Starr and the Rings of Saturn is the final novel in the Lucky Starr series, six juvenile science fiction novels by Isaac Asimov that originally appeared under the pseudonym Paul French. The novel was first published by Doubleday & Company in 1958. It was the last novel to be published by Asimov until his 1966 novelization of Fantastic Voyage, and his last original novel until 1973's The Gods Themselves. Lucky Starr and the Rings of Saturn is the only novel by Asimov set in the Saturnian system.

== Setting ==
Lucky Starr and the Rings of Saturn is set mostly within the Saturnian system, depicted as accurately as the knowledge of the late 1950s allowed. At that time, only nine satellites had been discovered, the innermost known satellite being Mimas. Asimov describes Mimas as being 340 miles in diameter, but its diameter is now known to be 240 miles. Several of the novel's chapters are set on Titan, which was then thought to be the third largest satellite in the Solar System, after Ganymede and Triton. Its atmosphere is described as "almost as thick as Earth's" and composed mostly of methane. It is now known that Titan is the second largest satellite in the Solar System after Ganymede, and that its atmosphere is denser than Earth's and is 98.4% nitrogen and only 1.6% methane.

The final chapters take place on the asteroid Vesta, which Asimov notes is the brightest of the asteroids. At the time, it was believed that Vesta was 215 miles in diameter, although its mean diameter is now known to be closer to 330 miles.

== Plot summary ==
Six weeks after returning from the Jovian system, David "Lucky" Starr learns that Jack Dorrance, the chief of a Sirian spy ring uncovered by Starr in the Jovian system, has escaped from Earth.

Starr and his sidekick Bigman Jones follow Dorrance to the Saturnian system, where Dorrance tries to lose them in Saturn's rings, but his ship is destroyed by a ring fragment. A Sirian ship then contacts Starr and informs him that the Sirians have built a colony on Titan and claimed it for Sirius, contrary to the traditional principle that inhabitants of one world in a stellar system have sovereignty over the entire system, even those parts without permanent settlements. Starr orders the pursuing Terrestrial fleet back to Earth; but returns with Bigman and Councilman Ben Wessilewsky to the Saturnian system.

When several Sirian ships pursue the Shooting Starr, Starr conceals himself and his ship in the interior of Mimas; leaves Wessilewsky below the surface with enough supplies to maintain himself for several months; then takes the Shooting Starr back into space, where they are captured by the Sirians and taken to the colony on Titan. There, Sirian commander Sten Devoure threatens to have Bigman killed unless Starr agrees to testify at an upcoming interstellar conference on the asteroid Vesta that he entered the Saturnian system to attack the Sirians. When Bigman endangers himself by defeating Devoure in a duel, Starr makes a deal with Devoure: if he spares Bigman's life, Starr will testify that he entered the Saturnian system in an armed ship, and will lead the Sirians to Wessilewsky's base on Mimas.

As delegates assemble for the conference, Agas Doremo, the leader of the neutralist forces of the Galaxy, tells Conway they should let the Sirians stay. While he supports the idea of stellar systems being indivisible, Doremo cannot see a way to get the Sirians out of the Solar System without a war, given the other worlds' distrust of Earth. However, should the Sirians remain, they might eventually overplay their hand, allowing for a new conference under more favorable conditions. However, he agrees to do what he can to support Earth's view should the opportunity arise.

Doremo is elected to preside over the conference; the one thing both sides agree upon. Devoure admits that the Sirians have established a base on Titan, but insists that the fact that Saturn and its moons are part of Earth's stellar system is irrelevant: "An empty world is an empty world, regardless of the particular route it travels through space. We colonized it first and it is ours". Devoure then brings out Starr, who admits to having re-entered the Saturnian system after being warned off, and also that Wessilewsky established a base on Mimas. Conway then receives permission to cross-examine Starr.

When asked his reasons, according to a secret plan of his own, Starr replies that Wessilewsky was placed to establish a colony on Mimas. At this, Conway states that by removing Wessilewsky from Mimas, the Sirians violated the very principle they attempted to establish - Devoure has stated earlier that the Sirians have never even approached Mimas earlier, so it is Earth's regardless of whose point of view is taken. Seeing the opportunity, Doremo points out the demonstrated implications of accepting the Sirian view; a war can start literally over every single rock. Then he manipulates the delegates into a vote before Sirius can work out a proper response. The conference ends with three client worlds voting with the Sirians, and the rest voting with Earth, with the result that the Sirians are ordered to leave Titan within a month – the principle of "Indivisibility of Stellar Systems" being firmly established, which the protagonists consider a positive and desirable outcome.

== Themes ==
Lucky Starr and the Rings of Saturn was written between December 1957 and February 1958, in the immediate aftermath of the launch of Sputnik I by the Soviet Union, and Asimov comments thereon in chapter 8, by having Starr talk about the superiority of Sirian robots:

"These robots are a human achievement. The humans that did the achieving are Sirians, yes, but they are human beings, too, and all other humans can share pride in the achievement. If we fear the results of their achievement, let's match it ourselves, or more than match it. But there's no use denying them the worth of their accomplishment".

Twice in the Lucky Starr series, in Lucky Starr and the Pirates of the Asteroids and Rings of Saturn, Earth finds itself on the brink of war with the Sirians as the result of Sirian aggression. On both occasions, Starr uses his formidable intellect to avert the war, on grounds that a true war would mean ruin to both worlds.

Rings of Saturn is the only novel in the series in which Sirians themselves appear as characters, as opposed to Sirian robots or Earthmen working for the Sirians. In chapter 10, a Sirian character contrasts his own society with that of Earth:

"We have kept our descent pure; we have not allowed the weaklings in, or those with poor genes. We have weeded out the unfit from among ourselves so that we are now a pure race of the strong, the fit, and the healthy, while Earth remains a conglomerate of the diseased and deformed (...) To the Outer Worlds, Councilman Starr, Earth is a terrible menace, a bomb of sub-humanity, ready to explode and contaminate the clean Galaxy. We don't want that to happen; we can't allow it to happen. It's what we're fighting for: a clean human race, composed of the fit."

Starr retorts:

"Composed of those you consider fit. But fitness comes in all shapes and forms. The great men of Earth have come from the tall and the short, from all manner of head shapes, skin colors, and languages. Variety is our salvation and the salvation of all mankind".

At one point, Devoure threatens to have Bigman locked inside a ship without food, just a tube of water to drink, and then sent to his death by robots. Later, Bigman is almost killed by a robot on Devoure's orders. Since the society of Sirius is eugenically bred to be uniformly tall, the robot believes Devoure when he says the much shorter Bigman is not a human being. Both themes; of robots harming people despite the Three Laws of Robotics, due to incomplete definition of "harm" and "human", are featured in Asimov's Robot and Foundation series, most prominently with relation to the planet Solaria. The Naked Sun also discusses the possibility of robots being able to fight spaceships and bombard planets due to being unaware they have humans upon them. In this book, Bigman attempts to discuss the potential harm to the Solar System's population with one of the Sirian robots, but the robot is ignorant about the subject and seems to be instructed or programmed to ignore attempts to teach it more.
