= Lucky Starr and the Big Sun of Mercury =

1956 novel by Isaac Asimov

- First edition
- Author: Isaac Asimov
- Cover artist: Darrell K. Sweet
- Language: English
- Series: Lucky Starr series
- Genre: Science fiction
- Publisher: Doubleday & Company
- Publication date: March 1956
- Publication place: United States
- Media type: Print (hardback & paperback)
- Pages: 186
- Preceded by: Lucky Starr and the Oceans of Venus
- Followed by: Lucky Starr and the Moons of Jupiter

Lucky Starr and the Big Sun of Mercury is the fourth novel in the Lucky Starr series, six juvenile science fiction novels by Isaac Asimov that were originally credited to Paul French, a pseudonym. The novel was first published by Doubleday & Company in March 1956. Since 1972, reprints have included a foreword by Asimov explaining that advancing knowledge of conditions on Mercury has rendered some of the novel's descriptions of that world inaccurate.

== Setting ==
Lucky Starr and the Big Sun of Mercury was written in 1955, when it was believed that Mercury was tidally locked to the Sun. A character notes that there are places on Mercury's sunside where it is hot enough to melt lead and boil sulfur, while the nightside is the only planetary surface in the Solar System that never sees the Sun. Most of the novel's action takes place in and around an astronomical observatory located at the planet's north pole, where libration results in a half-mile movement of the terminator. The observatory was built fifty years before on the site of a mining complex, which has since been abandoned.

== Plot summary ==
It has been a year since the events in Lucky Starr and the Oceans of Venus, and in that time a government-funded research project, Project Light, is built at the astronomical observatory on Mercury's north pole to conduct research into the newly discovered sub-etheric optics in hope of transmitting solar energy through hyperspace. The head of Project Light is the leading scientist in sub-etheric optics, Scott Mindes. A series of accidents has plagued Project Light, which David "Lucky" Starr and John Bigman Jones have come to investigate. Shortly after meeting Starr and Bigman, Mindes takes them onto the surface of Mercury and explains his worries; but works himself into a frenzy and fires a blaster at Starr, whereupon Bigman tackles him and he is brought unconscious into the observatory.

Starr and Bigman meet Mindes' friend Dr. Karl Gardoma, the observatory's physician; Jonathan Urteil, who works for a political opponent of the Council of Science named Senator Swenson; Dr. Lance Peverale, the head of the observatory; and Dr. Hanley Cook, Pevarale's chief assistant, who wants to succeed Peverale. The next day, at a banquet in Starr's honor, Peverale states his belief that the Sirians are behind the troubles plaguing Project Light; whereupon Starr replies that the Sirians' most likely locations are the abandoned mines located beneath the observatory, and proposes to search them.

Speaking to Cook after dinner, Starr learns Cook's opinion Peverale has become obsessed thinking of the Sirian threat. While Bigman prepares for the trip into the mines, Starr obtains two micro-ergometers, whereby to detect atomic power sources at a distance. In the mines, Starr tells Bigman that his suggestion of Sirians in the mines was a ruse, and that he intends to investigate the sunside while Bigman remains in the mines and maintains the pretense of Starr's presence there. After Starr leaves, Bigman is attacked by Urteil, and both are attacked by a heat-seeking native organism. Bigman distracts the latter with Urteil's blaster, then calls the Dome for help. On the sunside, Starr finds the source of the sabotage in a Sirian robot, driven by solar radiation to forego the Three Laws of Robotics, so that it attacks him before he can question it.

In the Dome, Bigman challenges Urteil to a fight in Mercurian gravity. Dr. Cook reduces the artificial gravity in the Dome's power room to Mercurian levels to accommodate them; but during the fight, the gravity suddenly returns to Earth-normal, and Urteil dies in a fall.

When Starr returns to the dome and learns of Urteil's death, he asks to be present when Peverale conducts an official inquiry, at which Bigman reveals that it was Cook who caused Urteil's death and reveals that only Cook knew where he and Starr would be in the mines, wherefore Urteil must have gotten the information from him. Cook then admits that Urteil had blackmailed him, and was killed to save Cook's career. Starr then reveals that the robot was brought from Sirius by Peverale in hope to use it to implicate the Sirians in the sabotage of Project Light. Starr has Peverale and Cook placed under arrest, and assumes control of the Dome in the name of the Council of Science.

On the return journey to Earth, Starr admits to Bigman that the present quarrel between Senator Swenson and the Council of Science was a draw, in that Jonathan Urteil was not able to manufacture any scandal against Project Light, but the two top men at the Mercury observatory were exposed as felons. Although Swenson is ruthless and dangerous, he is the sort of critic the council needs to keep it honest.

== Themes ==
Although the Sirians were first introduced in Lucky Starr and the Pirates of the Asteroids as the villains of the series, they remained nothing more than a vague external menace until this particular book. Dr. Peverale describes them thus in chapter 5:

"The planets of Sirius are thinly populated and they are extremely decentralized. They live in isolated individual family units, each with its own energy source and services. Each has its group of mechanical slaves — there's no other word possible — slaves in the form of positronic robots, which do the labor. The Sirian humans maintain themselves as a fighting aristocracy. Every one of them can handle a space-cruiser. They'll never rest until they can destroy the Earth . . . .

"They despise us. They consider us scarcely more than animals. The Sirians themselves are very race-conscious. Since Earthmen first colonized Sirius, they have been breeding themselves carefully until they are free of diseases and of various characteristics which they consider undesirable.

"They are of uniform appearance, while Earthmen are of all shapes, sizes, colors, varieties. The Sirians consider us inferior. That's why they won't let us emigrate to Sirius".

The Sirians therefore resemble the 'Solarians' of The Naked Sun, albeit less isolated and far more war-like. In Big Sun of Mercury, Starr notes that

"if the Sirians are race-conscious and are breeding themselves into uniformity, they will defeat themselves in the long run. It is variety in the human race that brings about progress. It is Earth and not Sirius that is in the forefront of scientific research. Earthmen settled Sirius in the first place, and it is we, not our Sirian cousins, who are advancing in new directions every year".

Also noteworthy is the fact that in Big Sun of Mercury, with its references to positronic robots and the Three Laws of Robotics, Asimov no longer attempts to disguise that he was the true author, although for the sake of continuity, the novel still appeared under his pseudonym of Paul French.
