= From Earth to Heaven =

Book by Isaac Asimov

- First edition cover
- Author: Isaac Asimov
- Language: English
- Series: Fantasy & Science Fiction essays
- Publisher: Doubleday
- Publication date: 1966
- Publication place: United States
- Media type: Print (Hardback and Paperback)
- Pages: 208
- ISBN: 0380421844
- Preceded by: Of Time and Space and Other Things
- Followed by: Science, Numbers, and I

From Earth to Heaven is a collection of seventeen scientific essays by American writer and scientist Isaac Asimov. It was the fifth of a series of books collecting essays from The Magazine of Fantasy and Science Fiction. It was first published by Doubleday & Company in 1966.

== Contents ==
- "Harmony in Heaven" (F&SF, February 1965)
- "Oh, East is West and West is East—" (March 1965)
- "The Certainty of Uncertainty" (April 1965)
- "To Tell a Chemist" (May 1965)
- "Future? Tense!" (June 1965)
- "Exclamation Point!" (July 1965)
- "Behind the Teacher's Back" (August 1965)
- "Death in the Laboratory" (September 1965)
- "The Land of Mu" (October 1965)
- "Squ-u-u-ush!" (November 1965)
- "Water, Water, Everywhere—" (December 1965)
- "The Proton-Reckoner" (January 1966)
- "Up and Down the Earth" (February 1966)
- "The Rocks of Damocles" (March 1966)
- "The Nobelmen of Science" (April 1966)
- "Time and Tide" (May 1966)
- "The Isles of Earth" (June 1966)
