= The Planet That Wasn't =

Collection of seventeen scientific essays written by Isaac Asimov

- First edition
- Author: Isaac Asimov
- Language: English
- Series: Fantasy & Science Fiction essays
- Genre: Science
- Publisher: Doubleday
- Publication date: 1976
- Publication place: United States
- Media type: print (Hardback and Paperback)
- ISBN: 038511687X
- Preceded by: Of Matters Great and Small
- Followed by: Quasar, Quasar, Burning Bright

The Planet That Wasn't is a collection of seventeen scientific essays by American writer and scientist Isaac Asimov. It was the twelfth of a series of books collecting essays from The Magazine of Fantasy and Science Fiction. These essays were first published between December 1974 and April 1976. It was first published by Doubleday & Company in 1976.

== Contents ==
- "Star In The East" (F&SF, December 1974)
- "Thinking About Thinking" (January 1975)
- "The Rocketing Dutchmen" (February 1975)
- "The Bridge of the Gods" (March 1975)
- "The Judo Argument" (April 1975)
- "The Planet That Wasn't" (May 1975)
- "The Olympian Snows" (June 1975)
- "Titanic Surprise" (July 1975)
- "The Wicked Witch is Dead" (August 1975)
- "The Wrong Turning" (September 1975)
- "The Third Liquid" (October 1975)
- "Best Foot Backward" (November 1975)
- "The Smell of Electricity" (December 1975)
- "Silent Victory" (January 1976)
- "Change of Air" (February 1976)
- "The Nightfall Effect" (March 1976)
- "All Gall" (April 1976)
