= Science, Numbers, and I =

Collection of essays by Isaac Asimov

- Cover of the first edition
- Author: Isaac Asimov
- Language: English
- Series: Fantasy and Science Fiction essays
- Publisher: Doubleday
- Publication date: 1968
- Publication place: United States
- Media type: Print (Hardcover and Paperback)
- ISBN: 0441754570
- Preceded by: From Earth to Heaven
- Followed by: The Solar System and Back

Science, Numbers, and I is a collection of seventeen scientific essays by American writer and scientist Isaac Asimov. It was the sixth of a series of books collecting essays from The Magazine of Fantasy and Science Fiction. It was first published by Doubleday & Company in 1968.

== Contents ==
- "Balancing the Books" (F&SF, July 1966)
- "BB or Not BB, That is the Question" (August 1966)
- "I'm Looking Over a Four-Leaf Clover" (September 1966)
- "Portrait of the Writer as a Boy" (October 1966)
- "Old Man River" (November 1966)
- "The Symbol-Minded Chemist" (December 1966)
- "Right Beneath Your Feet" (January 1967)
- "Impossible, That's All" (February 1967)
- "Crowded!" (March 1967)
- "A Matter of Scale" (April 1967)
- "Times of Our Lives" (May 1967)
- "Non-Time Travel" (June 1967)
- "Twelve Point Three Six Nine" (July 1967)
- "Kaleidoscope in the Sky" (August 1967)
- "The Great Borning" (September 1967)
- "Music to My Ears" (October 1967)
- "Knock Plastic!" (November 1967)
