= Lucky Starr series =

Juvenile science fiction book series by Isaac Asimov

Lucky Starr
- Cover from the 2001 Science Fiction Book Club omnibus edition.
- David Starr, Space Ranger (1952); Lucky Starr and the Pirates of the Asteroids (1953); Lucky Starr and the Oceans of Venus (1954); Lucky Starr and the Big Sun of Mercury (1956); Lucky Starr and the Moons of Jupiter (1957); Lucky Starr and the Rings of Saturn (1958)
- Author: Paul French
- Country: United States
- Language: English
- Genre: Science fiction
- Published: January 1952 – 1958
- No. of books: 6

Lucky Starr is the hero of a series of science fiction books by Isaac Asimov, using the pen name "Paul French" and intended for children.

On 23 March 1951 Asimov met with his agent, Frederik Pohl, and Walter I. Bradbury, then the science fiction editor at Doubleday & Co., who had a proposal for him. Pohl and Bradbury wanted Asimov to write a juvenile science fiction novel that would serve as the basis for a television series. Fearing that the novel would be adapted into the "uniformly awful" programming he saw flooding the television channels, he decided to publish it under the pseudonym "Paul French".

Asimov began work on the novel, David Starr: Space Ranger, on 10 June. He completed it on 29 July, and it was published by Doubleday in January 1952. Although plans for the television series fell through, Asimov continued to write novels in the series, eventually producing six. A seventh, Lucky Starr and the Snows of Pluto, was planned, but abandoned when Asimov elected to devote himself to writing non-fiction almost exclusively. With no worries about being associated with an embarrassing televised version, Asimov decided to abandon the pretense that he was not the author (although the books continued to be published under the Paul French pseudonym). He brought the Three Laws of Robotics into Lucky Starr and the Big Sun of Mercury, which he wrote in his autobiography "was a dead giveaway to Paul French's identity for even the most casual reader".

Eventually, Asimov used his own name in later editions. Some cover pages bear his name only, while others credit "Isaac Asimov writing as Paul French".

== Publishing history ==
- David Starr, Space Ranger (1952)
- Lucky Starr and the Pirates of the Asteroids (1953)
- Lucky Starr and the Oceans of Venus (1954)
- Lucky Starr and the Big Sun of Mercury (1956)
- Lucky Starr and the Moons of Jupiter (1957)
- Lucky Starr and the Rings of Saturn (1958)

Although the hero's given name – used on the first book – was "David" (chosen in honor of his own son), Asimov decided this lacked vigor, so the titles of all the later books used his nickname "Lucky".

These novels have regularly been reprinted. They came out in hardcover with Doubleday in the first edition. Bantam, in 1993, published the series in 3 volumes, publishing pairs of titles together. In 2001 the Science Fiction Book Club published all six novels as a collection in a single volume, under the title The Complete Adventures of Lucky Starr.

The British first editions of all six novels omit the prefix altogether, being titled Space Ranger, Oceans of Venus, etc. A later British paperback edition of the 1970s, published by NEL (in the New English Library series), restored the original titles – but in numbering them from 1 to 6, on the covers, in fact published them in the wrong order.

The first book was translated into French in 1954 under the title Sur la planète rouge ("On the Red Planet") with the original pseudonym, Paul French. It was published in the "Anticipation" science fiction imprint of Fleuve noir. It was later adapted as a French comic story twice, in 1975 and 1992.

Three books were published in Dutch. Titles were, in order of the original American series:

- Een man alleen (orig. David Starr, Space Ranger), 1977
- Piraten van de asteroïden (Lucky Starr and the Pirates of the Asteroids), 1978
- De grote zon van Mercurius (Lucky Starr and the Big Sun of Mercury), 1978

Five of the six books (the later five) were published in israel, in hebrew, in 1979. Mesada publishing house, translated by Reuven Liman, and edited by Amos Gefen. The translation is notably excellent, and combines ancient and modern hebrew. The titles: לאקי סטאר ושודדי הכוכביות לאקי סטאר ואוקיינוסי נוגה לאקי סטאר וכוכב החמה לאקי סטאר וירחי צדק לאקי סטאר וטבעות שבתאי

Omnibus and collected editions:

- Science Fiction Book club (6 in 1) ISBN 0-7394-1941-2
- Bantam (first two novels) ISBN 0-553-29166-1

== Science content ==
Asimov carefully introduced astronomical and physical concepts which the scientific knowledge of the time supported. In later editions, he added prefaces pointing out that new scientific discoveries have rendered some locations and concepts obsolete: Mercury does not present only one side to the Sun, and Venus is not covered by a global ocean, for example.
