= The Left Hand of the Electron =

1972 collection of nonfiction essays by Isaac Asimov

- First edition
- Author: Isaac Asimov
- Language: English
- Series: Fantasy & Science Fiction essays
- Subject: Science
- Publisher: Doubleday
- Publication date: 1972
- Publication place: United States
- Media type: Print (Hardback and Paperback)
- Pages: 225
- ISBN: 0-385-04345-7
- Preceded by: The Stars in their Courses
- Followed by: The Tragedy of the Moon

The Left Hand of the Electron is a collection of seventeen nonfiction science essays by American writer and scientist Isaac Asimov, first published by Doubleday & Company in 1972. It was the ninth of a series of books collecting essays from The Magazine of Fantasy and Science Fiction. The title comes from the topic of the first section which deals with chirality of electroweak interactions and chirality of organic compounds and the possible connection between the two. Other essays in this book concern the effect of electron-spin direction on molecular structure e.g. the "Inverse Sugar" (similar to Inverted sugar syrup) in honey with philosophical reflections on the minority of left handedness in general.

== Chapters ==
- A — The Problem of Left and Right
  - 1 — Odds and Evens
  - 2 — The Left Hand of the Electron
  - 3 — Seeing Double
  - 4 — The 3-D Molecule
  - 5 — The Asymmetry of Life
- B — The Problem of Oceans
  - 6 — The Thalassogens
  - 7 — Hot Water
  - 8 — Cold Water
- C — The Problem of Numbers and Lines
  - 9 — Prime Quality
  - 10 — Euclid's Fifth
  - 11 — The Plane Truth
- D — The Problem of the Platypus
  - 12 — Holes in the Head
- E — The Problem of History
  - 13 — The Eureka Phenomenon
  - 14 — Pompey and Circumstance
  - 15 — Bill and I
- F — The Problem of Population
  - 16 — Stop!
  - 17 — ...But How?
