= Of Time and Space and Other Things =

Book by Isaac Asimov

- First edition
- Author: Isaac Asimov
- Language: English
- Series: Fantasy & Science Fiction essays
- Publisher: Doubleday
- Publication date: 1965
- Publication place: United States
- Media type: print (Hardback and Paperback)
- Preceded by: Adding a Dimension
- Followed by: From Earth to Heaven

Of Time and Space and Other Things is a collection of seventeen scientific essays by Isaac Asimov. It was the fourth of a series of books collecting essays from The Magazine of Fantasy and Science Fiction. It was first published by Doubleday & Company in 1965.

== Contents ==
1. C for Celeritas (F&SF, November 1959)
2. Just Mooning Around (May 1963)
3. Welcome, Stranger! (November 1963)
4. Roll Call (December 1963)
5. Round and Round and... (January 1964)
6. The Slowly Moving Finger (February 1964)
7. Forget It! (March 1964)
8. A Piece of the Action (April 1964)
9. Ghost Lines in the Sky (May 1964)
10. The Heavenly Zoo (June 1964)
11. Nothing Counts (July 1964)
12. The Days of Our Years (August 1964)
13. The Haste-Makers (September 1964)
14. First and Rearmost (October 1964)
15. The Black of Night (November 1964)
16. A Galaxy at a Time (December 1964)
17. Begin at the Beginning (January 1965)
