= The Solar System and Back =

1970 collection of essays by Isaac Asimov

- First edition
- Author: Isaac Asimov
- Language: English
- Series: Fantasy & Science Fiction essays
- Subject: Science Essays
- Publisher: Doubleday
- Publication date: January 19, 1970
- Publication place: United States
- Media type: Print (Hardback and Paperback)
- Pages: 246
- ISBN: 0-385-02345-6
- Preceded by: Science, Numbers, and I
- Followed by: The Stars in their Courses

The Solar System and Back (1970) is a collection of science essays by American writer and scientist Isaac Asimov. It is the seventh in a series of books reprinting essays from The Magazine of Fantasy & Science Fiction.

== Contents ==
- "Nothing" (March 1959)
- "The First Metal" (December 1967)
- "The Seventh Metal" (January 1968)
- "The Predicted Metal" (February 1968)
- "The Seventh Planet" (March 1968)
- "The Dance of the Sun" (April 1968)
- "Backward, Turn Backward—" (May 1968)
- "Counting Chromosomes" (June 1968)
- "Little Lost Satellite" (July 1968)
- "The Terrible Lizards" (August 1968)
- "The Dying Lizards" (September 1968)
- "Little Found Satellite" (October 1968)
- "The Planetary Eccentric" (November 1968)
- "View from Amalthea" (December 1968)
- "The Dance of the Satellites" (January 1969)
- "Uncertain, Coy, and Hard to Please" (February 1969)
- "Just Right" (March 1969)
- "The Incredible Shrinking People" (April 1969)
