= The Subatomic Monster =

Book by Isaac Asimov

- First edition
- Author: Isaac Asimov
- Language: English
- Series: Fantasy & Science Fiction essays
- Genre: Science
- Publisher: Doubleday
- Publication date: 1985
- Publication place: United States
- Media type: print (Hardback and Paperback)
- Pages: 213
- ISBN: 0-385-19659-8
- Preceded by: 'X' Stands for Unknown
- Followed by: Far as Human Eye Could See

The Subatomic Monster (1985) is a collection of seventeen nonfiction science essays by American writer and scientist Isaac Asimov. It was the eighteenth of a series of books collecting essays from The Magazine of Fantasy and Science Fiction, these being first published between June 1983 and October 1984. It was first published by Doubleday & Company in 1985.

== Contents ==
- "The Properties of Chaos" (June 1983)
- "Green, Green, Green is the Color ..." (July 1983)
- "What Truck?" (August 1983)
- "Where All the Sky is Sunshine" (September 1983)
- "Updating the Satellites" (October 1983)
- "More Thinking about Thinking" (November 1983)
- "Arm of the Giant" (December 1983)
- "The World of the Red Sun" (January 1984)
- "The Subatomic Monster" (February 1984)
- "Love Makes the World Go Round!" (March 1984)
- "E Pluribus Unum" (April 1984)
- "Up We Go" (May 1984)
- "The Two Masses" (June 1984)
- "The Victorious General" (July 1984)
- "Coming Full Circle" (August 1984)
- "The Different Years of Time" (September 1984)
- "The Different Years of the Universe" (October 1984)
