= The Tragedy of the Moon =

Book by Isaac Asimov

- First edition
- Author: Isaac Asimov
- Cover artist: Roger Zimmerman
- Language: English
- Series: Fantasy & Science Fiction essays
- Genre: Science
- Publisher: Doubleday
- Publication date: 1973
- Publication place: United States
- Media type: print (Hardback and Paperback)
- Pages: 220
- ISBN: 0-385-07221-X
- Preceded by: The Left Hand of the Electron
- Followed by: Of Matters Great and Small

The Tragedy of the Moon is a collection of seventeen nonfiction science essays by American writer and scientist Isaac Asimov. It was the tenth of a series of books collecting essays from The Magazine of Fantasy and Science Fiction, these being first published between March 1972 and July 1973. It was first published by Doubleday & Company in 1973.

== Contents ==
- A — About the Moon
  - 1 — The Tragedy of the Moon
  - 2 — The Triumph of the Moon
  - 3 — Moon Over Babylon
  - 4 — The Week Excuse
- B — About Other Small Worlds
  - 5 — The World Ceres
  - 6 — The Clock in the Sky
- C — About Carbon
  - 7 — The One and Only
  - 8 — The Unlikely Twins
- D — About Micro-organisms
  - 9 — Through The Microglass
  - 10 — Down From The Amoeba
  - 11 — The Cinderella Compound
- E — About the Thyroid Gland
  - 12 — Doctor, Doctor, Cut My Throat
- F — About Society
  - 13 — Lost in Non-Translation
  - 14 — The Ancient and the Ultimate
  - 15 — By The Numbers
- G — And (You Guessed It!) About Me
  - 16 — The Cruise And I (July 1973)
  - 17 — Academe And I
