= Counting the Eons =

Book by Isaac Asimov

- First edition
- Author: Isaac Asimov
- Cover artist: Kyoshi Kanai
- Language: English
- Series: Fantasy & Science Fiction essays
- Publisher: Doubleday
- Publication date: 7 January 1983
- Publication place: United States
- Media type: print (Hardback and Paperback)
- Preceded by: The Sun Shines Bright
- Followed by: 'X' Stands for Unknown

Counting the Eons is a collection of seventeen nonfiction science essays written by Isaac Asimov. It was the sixteenth of a series of books collecting essays from The Magazine of Fantasy and Science Fiction, these being first published between August 1980 and December 1981. It was first published by Doubleday & Company in 1983.

== Contents ==
1. The Earth
  1. Light as Air? (March 1981)
  2. Too Deep for Me (April 1981)
  3. Under Pressure (May 1981)
  4. The Word I Invented (October 1980)
  5. Yes! With a Bang! (June 1981)
  6. Let Me Count the Days (October 1981)
  7. Counting the Eons (November 1980)
2. The Stars
  8. The Runaway Star (July 1981)
  9. The Dance of the Stars (August 1981)
3. The Universe
  10. Getting Down to Basics (September 1980)
  11. And After Many a Summer Dies the Proton (September 1981)
  12. Let Einstein Be! (December 1981)
  13. Beyond Earth's Eons (December 1980)
  14. The Crucial Asymmetry (November 1981)
  15. All and Nothing (January 1981)
  16. Nothing and All (February 1981)
4. Literature
  17. Milton! Thou Shouldst Be Living at This Hour (August 1980)
