= Far as Human Eye Could See =

Book by Isaac Asimov

- First edition
- Author: Isaac Asimov
- Language: English
- Series: Fantasy & Science Fiction essays
- Subject: science
- Publisher: Doubleday
- Publication date: 1987
- Publication place: United States
- Media type: print (Hardback and Paperback)
- Pages: 214
- ISBN: 0-385-23514-3
- Preceded by: The Subatomic Monster
- Followed by: The Relativity of Wrong

Far as Human Eye Could See: Essays on Science (published 1987) is a collection of science essays by American writer and scientist Isaac Asimov, short works which originally appeared in The Magazine of Fantasy and Science Fiction (F&SF), these being first published between November 1984 and March 1986.

== Contents ==
(with date of original publication):

- Part One: Physical Chemistry
  - "Made, Not Found" (December 1984)
  - "Salt and Battery" (February 1985)
  - "Current Affairs" (March 1985)
  - "Forcing the Lines" (April 1985)
  - "Arise, Fair Sun!" (May 1985)
- Part Two: Biochemistry
  - "Poison in the Negative" (July 1985)
  - "Tracing the Traces" (August 1985)
  - "The Goblin Element" (September 1985)
  - "A Little Leaven" (October 1985)
  - "The Biochemical Knife-Blade" (November 1985)
- Part Three: Geochemistry
  - "Far, Far Below" (January 1985)
- Part Four: Astronomy
  - "Time is Out of Joint" (February 1986)
  - "The Discovery of the Void" (December 1985)
  - "Chemistry of the Void" (January 1986)
  - "The Rule of Numerous Small" (June 1985)
  - "Superstar:" (March 1986)
  - " Far as Human Eye Could See" (November 1984)
