= X Stands for Unknown =

Book by Isaac Asimov

'X' Stands for Unknown
- First edition
- Author: Isaac Asimov
- Language: English
- Series: Fantasy & Science Fiction essays
- Genre: science essay
- Published: 1984 (Doubleday)
- Publication place: United States
- Media type: print (Hardback and Paperback)
- Pages: 218
- ISBN: 0-385-18915-X
- Preceded by: Counting the Eons
- Followed by: The Subatomic Monster

'X' Stands for Unknown is a collection of seventeen nonfiction science essays written by Isaac Asimov. It was the seventeenth of a series of books collecting essays from The Magazine of Fantasy and Science Fiction, these being first published between January 1982 and May 1983. It was first published by Doubleday & Company in 1984.

== Contents ==
- Physics
  - 1 Read Out Your Good Book in Verse (May 1982)
  - 2 Four Hundred Octaves (June 1982)
  - 3 The Three Who Died Too Soon (July 1982)
  - 4 X Stands for Unknown (August 1982)
- Chemistry
  - 5 Big Brother (September 1982)
  - 6 Bread and Stone (October 1982)
  - 7 A Difference of an 'E' (November 1982)
  - 8 Silicon Life After All (December 1982)
- Astronomy
  - 9 The Long Ellipse (January 1982)
  - 10 Change of Time and State (April 1982)
  - 11 Whatzisname's Orbit (March 1982)
  - 12 Ready and Waiting (February 1983)
  - 13 Dead Centre (April 1983)
  - 14 Out in the Boondocks (May 1983)
- Mathematics
  - 15 To Ungild Refinèd Gold (January 1983)
  - 16 The Circle of the Earth (February 1982)
  - 17 The Armies of the Night (March 1983)

== Reception ==
Dave Langford reviewed X Stands for Unknown for White Dwarf #79, and stated that "If you're scientifically literate you'll find the interesting bits buried in over-familiar stuff (though I always cheer Asimov when he stomps the crackpots). If not, you probably don't read books like this. That's showbiz."

== Reviews ==
- Review by Edward James (1985) in Paperback Inferno, #55
