= Of Matters Great and Small =

Collection of essays by Isaac Asimov

- First edition
- Author: Isaac Asimov
- Language: English
- Series: Fantasy & Science Fiction essays
- Genre: Science
- Publisher: Doubleday
- Publication date: 1975
- Publication place: United States
- Media type: print (Hardback and Paperback)
- ISBN: 0441610722
- Preceded by: The Tragedy of the Moon
- Followed by: The Planet That Wasn't

Of Matters Great and Small is a collection of seventeen scientific essays by American writer and scientist Isaac Asimov. It was the eleventh of a series of books collecting essays from The Magazine of Fantasy and Science Fiction, although it also includes one essay from Science Digest. It was first published by Doubleday & Company in 1975.

== Contents ==
- "Constant as the Northern Star" (F&SF, August 1973)
- "Signs of the Times" (September 1973)
- "The Mispronounced Metal" (October 1973)
- "The Figure of the Fastest" (November 1973)
- "The Figure of the Farthest" (December 1973)
- "The Eclipse and I" (January 1974)
- "Dance of the Luminaries" (February 1974)
- "The Uneternal Atoms" (March 1974)
- "A Particular Matter" (April 1974)
- "At Closest Range" (May 1974)
- "The Double-Ended Candle" (June 1974)
- "The Inevitability of Life" (Science Digest, June 1974)
- "As Easy as Two Plus Three" (F&SF, July 1974)
- "Updating the Asteroids" (August 1974)
- "Look Long upon a Monkey" (September 1974)
- "O Keen-eyed Peerer into the Future!" (October 1974)
- "Skewered!" (November 1974)
