= The Stars in Their Courses =

Collection of essays by Isaac Asimov

- First edition
- Author: Isaac Asimov
- Language: English
- Series: Essays from The Magazine of Fantasy & Science Fiction
- Genre: Science
- Publisher: Doubleday
- Publication date: 1971
- Publication place: United States
- Media type: Print (Hardback and Paperback)
- Preceded by: The Solar System and Back
- Followed by: The Left Hand of the Electron

The Stars in Their Courses is a collection of seventeen scientific essays by American writer Isaac Asimov. It is the eighth in a series of books collecting his essays from The Magazine of Fantasy & Science Fiction (May 1969 to September 1970). Doubleday & Company first published the collection in 1971.

== Contents ==
- Introduction
- Part A: Astronomy
  - "The Stars in their Courses"
  - "The Lop-sided Sun"
  - "The Lunar Honor-roll"
  - "Worlds in Confusion"
- Part B: Physics
  - "Two at a Time"
  - "On Throwing a Ball"
  - "The Man Who Massed the Earth"
  - "The Luxon Wall"
  - "Playing the Game"
  - "The Distance of Far"
- Part C: Chemistry
  - "The Multiplying Elements"
  - "Bridging the Gaps"
  - "The Nobel Prize That Wasn't"
- Part D: Sociology
  - "The Fateful Lightning"
  - "The Sin of the Scientist"
  - "The Power of Progression"
  - "My Planet, 'tis of Thee—"
