= The Sun Shines Bright (book) =

Book by Isaac Asimov

- First edition
- Author: Isaac Asimov
- Language: English
- Series: Fantasy & Science Fiction essays
- Genre: Science
- Publisher: Doubleday
- Publication date: 20 November 1981
- Publication place: United States
- Media type: print (Hardback and Paperback)
- Pages: 250
- ISBN: 0-385-17145-5
- Preceded by: The Road to Infinity
- Followed by: Counting the Eons

The Sun Shines Bright is a collection of seventeen nonfiction science essays by American writer and scientist Isaac Asimov. It was the fifteenth of a series of books collecting essays from The Magazine of Fantasy and Science Fiction. It was first published by Doubleday & Company in 1981.

== Contents ==
- The Sun
  1. Out, Damned Spot!
  2. The Sun Shines Bright
  3. The Noblest Metal of Them All
- The Stars
  4. How Little?
  5. Siriusly Speaking
  6. Below the Horizon
- The Planets
  7. Just Thirty Years
- The Moon
  8. A Long Day's Journey
  9. The Inconstant Moon
- The Elements
  10. The Useless Metal
  11. Neutrality!
  12. The Finger of God
- The Cell
  13. Clone, Clone of My Own
- The Scientists
  14. Alas, All Human
- The People
  15. The Unsecret Weapon
  16. More Crowded!
  17. Nice Guys Finish First!

== Reception ==
Dave Langford reviewed The Sun Shines Bright for White Dwarf #44, and stated that "Each essay presents some interesting insight or viewpoint, usually scientific; most of them, alas, are padded and smothered with great wads of facts, statistics and numbers in general, the result being relatively dull."

== Reviews ==
- Review by David Langford [as by Dave Langford] (1983) in Paperback Inferno, Volume 7, Number 1
