= The Road to Infinity =

Collection of essays by Isaac Asimov

- First edition
- Author: Isaac Asimov
- Language: English
- Series: Fantasy & Science Fiction essays
- Genre: Science
- Publisher: Doubleday
- Publication date: 1979
- Publication place: United States
- Media type: Print (Hardback and Paperback)
- ISBN: 038514962X
- Preceded by: Quasar, Quasar, Burning Bright
- Followed by: The Sun Shines Bright

The Road to Infinity is a collection of seventeen scientific essays by American writer and scientist Isaac Asimov. It was the fourteenth of a series of books collecting Asimov's science essays from The Magazine of Fantasy and Science Fiction. It also included a list of all of Asimov's essays in that magazine up to 1979. It was first published by Doubleday & Company in 1979.

== Contents ==
- "The Subtlest Difference" (F&SF, October 1977)
- "The Sons of Mars Revisited" (November 1977)
- "Dark and Bright" (December 1977)
- "The Real Finds Waiting" (January 1978)
- "The Lost Art" (February 1978)
- "Anyone For Tens?" (March 1978)
- "The Floating Crystal Palace" (April 1978)
- "By Land and By Sea" (May 1978)
- "We Were the First that Ever Burst" (June 1978)
- "Second to the Skua" (July 1978)
- "Rings and Things" (August 1978)
- "Countdown" (September 1978)
- "Toward Zero" (October 1978)
- "Fifty Million Big Brothers" (November 1978)
- "Where is Everybody?" (December 1978)
- "Proxima" (January 1979)
- "The Road to Infinity" (February 1979)
