= David Starr, Space Ranger =

1952 novel by Isaac Asimov

- First edition cover
- Author: Isaac Asimov
- Cover artist: Richard Powers
- Language: English
- Series: Lucky Starr series
- Genre: Science fiction novel
- Publisher: Doubleday
- Publication date: January 1952
- Publication place: United States
- Media type: Print (hardback & paperback)
- Pages: 186
- Followed by: Lucky Starr and the Pirates of the Asteroids

David Starr, Space Ranger is the first novel in the Lucky Starr series, six juvenile science fiction novels by Isaac Asimov that originally appeared under the pseudonym Paul French. The novel was written between 10 June and 29 July 1951 and first published by Doubleday & Company in January 1952. Since 1971, reprints have included an introduction by Asimov explaining that advancing knowledge of conditions on Mars have rendered some of the novel's descriptions of that world inaccurate. The novel was originally intended to serve as the basis for a television series, a science-fictionalized version of The Lone Ranger, but the series was never made, in part because another series called Rocky Jones, Space Ranger was already in the planning stages.

== Plot summary ==
By 7000 A.D., humanity has founded colonies on the inner planets of the Solar System, as well as other planetary systems with separate and sometimes hostile governments. The most powerful organization in the Solar System is the Council of Science, which uses scientific expertise and field agents to counter political and military threats to Earth's government.

David Starr is a young biophysicist orphaned as an infant and raised by his guardians Augustus Henree and Hector Conway, high-ranking Council members who send David on missions for the Council. They tell him of recent victims fatally poisoned by produce imported from Mars. Fearing a conspiracy to start a food panic and wreck interplanetary trade, they send Starr undercover to Mars.

There, Starr meets John "Bigman" Jones, a Martian farmboy blacklisted by the Martian Farming Syndicates after witnessing underhanded dealings. When his former boss Hennes orders Bigman out of the Farm Employment Building, Starr stands up for him and gains positions for both himself and Bigman. The humiliated Hennes subsequently has Starr and Bigman knocked out and brought to the farm owned by Hennes' boss, Mr. Makian, who apologizes and appears friendly.

Starr says his name is Williams and he came from Earth to investigate his sister's death from food poisoning. Makian sends him to the farm's agronomist Benson, who explains that the poisoned food came from several Martian farms and was exported through the domed Wingrad City. Meanwhile Makian and other farm owners have been pressured to sell their farms for ridiculously small sums. Benson also suggests that intelligent native Martians living below the planet's surface are poisoning the food to drive off the humans.

Makian sends Starr and Bigman on a survey of the farmlands led by Hennes' friend Griswold. Unfamiliar with Martian gravity, Starr nearly skids his sand-car into a crevasse. After Bigman discovers the car is missing the required ballast-weights, Starr accuses Griswold of trying to kill him. They fight, and Griswold falls into the crevasse.

The next day, Benson makes Starr his assistant to ward off Hennes. Bigman receives his references from Hennes and takes his leave but returns that night to the farm to meet Starr and tells him he recognized him as belonging to the Council (whose members are publicly listed, though they try to minimize publicity).

Starr tells Bigman that he believes in Benson's Martians, and that the crevasse into which Griswold fell is an entrance to their caverns. Starr descends into the crevasse and is captured by Martian aliens — disembodied intelligences curious about the Earthmen on the surface. They know nothing of the poisoned food – although, according to them, any organic Martian matter is poison for Earthmen. They give Starr the name "Space Ranger" and present him with an immaterial mask producing a personal force field that can protect and disguise him.

Starr uses the mask to shield himself from a Martian dust storm as he returns to Makian's farm, where he is questioned on how he survived the storm and answers that he was rescued by a masked man called the Space Ranger. Benson tells him the farm owners have received an extortion letter from the poisoner, threatening to a thousandfold increase of poisoned food unless they sell out to him within 36 hours.

After again trying to kill Starr, Hennes accuses Starr of being the poisoner. Bigman enters, having brought Dr. Silvers of the Council, who announces that the government has declared an emergency and that the Council will take control of all farms on Mars. If the mystery is not solved, all Martian food exports to Earth will stop, forcing food rationing.

Disguised by his Martian mask, Starr confronts Hennes, who blinds himself firing a blaster at the protective field. Starr searches Hennes and finds incriminating evidence. The next day, at a meeting with Silvers, Makian, Hennes and Benson, Starr appears as the Space Ranger. He reveals that it was Benson who poisoned the food while pretending to take samples of it, while Hennes was his accomplice in contact with criminal syndicates in the Asteroid Belt; the distraught Benson confesses. Afterward, Bigman confides to Starr that despite the disguise, he recognized him by his black-and-white boots, too plain for any Martian.

== Analysis ==
David Starr: Space Ranger is the only Asimov novel set on Mars. Asimov's Martian atmosphere is one-fifth as dense as Earth's and lacks oxygen. He does not mention the famous Martian canals.

== Reception ==
Writing in The New York Times, Ellen Lewis Buell reported that Asimov "ingeniously combines mystery with science fiction, saying that "his inventiveness and use of picturesque details" were reminiscent of Robert A. Heinlein. Groff Conklin praised the novel as effective juvenile fare: "no romance, parlous little science, but endless imagination, exciting ideas and events." Astounding reviewer P. Schuyler Miller described it as "fast-moving space opera of a type we all know, with no particular regard for scientific plausibility."
