= Quasar, Quasar, Burning Bright =

1978 collection of essays by Isaac Asimov

- First edition
- Author: Isaac Asimov
- Language: English
- Series: Fantasy & Science Fiction essays
- Publisher: Doubleday
- Publication date: 1978
- Publication place: United States
- Media type: Print (Hardback and Paperback)
- Pages: 240
- ISBN: 0-385-13464-9
- Preceded by: The Planet That Wasn't
- Followed by: The Road to Infinity

Quasar, Quasar, Burning Bright is a collection of seventeen scientific essays by American writer and scientist Isaac Asimov. It was the thirteenth of a series of books collecting essays from The Magazine of Fantasy and Science Fiction. These essays were first published between May 1976 and September 1977. It was first published by Doubleday & Company in 1978. Its title is derived from the first line of William Blake's 1794 poem "The Tyger".

== Contents ==
- "It's a Wonderful Town!" (May 1976)
- "Surprise! Surprise!" (June 1976)
- "Making It!" (July 1976)
- "Moving Ahead" (August 1976)
- "To the Top" (September 1976)
- "Quasar, Quasar, Burning Bright" (October 1976)
- "The Comet That Wasn't" (November 1976)
- "The Sea-Green Planet" (December 1976)
- "Discovery by Blink" (January 1977)
- "Asimov's Corollary" (February 1977)
- "The Magic Isle" (March 1977)
- "The Dark Companion" (April 1977)
- "Twinkle, Twinkle, Microwaves" (May 1977)
- "The Final Collapse" (June 1977)
- "Of Ice and Men" (July 1977)
- "Oblique the Centric Globe" (August 1977)
- "The Opposite Poles" (September 1977)
