= Lucky Starr and the Oceans of Venus =

Juvenile science fiction novel by Isaac Asimov

- First edition
- Author: Isaac Asimov
- Cover artist: Richard M. Powers
- Language: English
- Series: Lucky Starr series
- Genre: Science fiction
- Publisher: Doubleday & Company
- Publication date: 1954
- Publication place: United States
- Media type: Print (hardback & paperback)
- Pages: 186
- Preceded by: Lucky Starr and the Pirates of the Asteroids
- Followed by: Lucky Starr and the Big Sun of Mercury

Lucky Starr and the Oceans of Venus is the third novel in the Lucky Starr series, six juvenile science fiction novels by Isaac Asimov that originally appeared under the pseudonym Paul French. The novel was first published by Doubleday & Company in 1954. Since 1972, reprints have included a foreword by Asimov explaining that advancing knowledge of conditions on Venus have rendered the novel's descriptions of that world inaccurate.

In his 1979 autobiography In Memory Yet Green, Asimov notes that his original version of the novel was rejected by Doubleday and had to be extensively revised before it was accepted:

On the whole, Doubleday was justified, for Lucky Starr, in this particular adventure, was needlessly close-mouthed, allowing his sidekick to think he was an utter bastard, when I was merely trying to keep things from the reader. I had to rewrite in such a way as to keep things from the reader in a subtler fashion and more in keeping with Lucky's character.

== Setting ==
Lucky Starr and the Oceans of Venus was written in the mid-1950s, when little was known about Venus apart from its mass, volume, orbital characteristics, and the fact of its unbroken cloud cover. Asimov assumed that Venus has a temperate climate, with a period of rotation of 36 hours, a planet-wide ocean covering the surface, and an atmosphere that is 90% nitrogen and 10% carbon dioxide; that the planetary ocean is covered with blue-green native vegetation; and that native animals inhabit the ocean. These animals, many of them phosphorescent, include an aggressive carnivore called an orange patch that shoots a jet of water at its prey, and the V-frogs, small amphibians that the human colonists keep as pets.

Asimov's Venus has a human population of six million living in some fifty domed cities on the ocean floor. The largest Venusian city is Aphrodite, with a population of a quarter million. The chief exports are fertilizer made from the native vegetation, and animal feed derived from cultivated yeast.

== Plot summary ==
Shortly after returning from the Asteroid Belt, David "Lucky" Starr learns that his Science Academy roommate Lou Evans had been sent to investigate trouble on Venus, but the Council of Science office on Venus has requested that he be recalled and investigated for corruption.

As Starr and John "Bigman" Jones are shuttled to Venus, their pilots suffer an episode of paralysis, and Starr is required to keep their craft from smashing itself against the surface of the Venusian ocean. Afterwards, the pilots have no memory of the event.

Upon reaching the Venusian city of Aphrodite, Starr and Bigman meet Dr. Mel Morriss, head of the Council of Science on Venus, who explains that Venusian scientists are perfecting strains of yeast that can be processed into luxury foods for export; whereas for six months there has been a growing series of incidents of bizarre behavior among the human colonists, often followed by amnesia. Morriss believes they are being telepathically controlled by an unknown enemy. Evans was sent to Venus to investigate, but was found with stolen data concerning a secret strain of yeast, and is under arrest. When Starr confronts him, Evans admits to having stolen the data, but refuses to explain further. While Starr is questioning him, word reaches them that a man is threatening to open an outside airlock, which will allow the ocean to flood Aphrodite.

Starr, Bigman, and Morriss go to the airlock to deal with the crisis, where they meet the city's chief engineer, Lyman Turner, the inventor and owner of a laptop computer carried with him. While Bigman goes through the ventilation ducts to cut power to the airlock door, Starr realizes that the airlock crisis is a feint and hastens to Council headquarters, to find that Evans has escaped custody and left Aphrodite in a submarine.

Starr and Bigman pursue Evans in another submarine, eventually finding him and learning that the V-frogs are the source of the telepathic incidents; Evans having tested this hypothesis by stealing the secret data on the yeast strain, and interesting the V-frogs therein with the result of an accident involving that strain. Evans further reveals that the V-frogs have trapped himself and the other protagonists beneath an enormous deep-sea orange patch, which will attack them if they attempt escape.

Starr, in response, leaves the submarine and uses an electric shock to destroy the orange patch's heart, killing it. He then returns to the submarine, and pilots this to the surface of the ocean, where he intends to communicate his findings to an orbiting space station to be relayed to the Council on Earth.

On the surface, the V-frogs communicate telepathically with him, telling him they intend to take over the minds of the humans on Venus. Initially they keep him away from the radio; but he is able to distract them and transmit his message. Returning to Aphrodite, Starr explains to Morriss that the V-frogs' telepathy is used by a human individual to attempt control over the rest of humanity, and that the means of doing so is Lyman Turner's computer. Bigman destroys the computer and Starr captures Turner, hoping to re-create his computer in the interest of reforming Turner himself.

== Themes ==
In Lucky Starr and the Oceans of Venus, Asimov returned to a recurring theme of his work — the use of mental powers to influence or control the actions of others. As far back as "Half-Breeds on Venus" in 1940, Asimov was writing about telepathic Venusians mentally controlling a native sauropod. The character of the Mule from the 1945 Foundation story of the same name, and Joseph Schwartz from the 1950 novel Pebble in the Sky could also use their mental powers to control others. Later, Asimov would introduce the mind-reading robot R. Giskard Reventlov in the 1983 novel The Robots of Dawn, and the telepathic world-entity Erythro in the 1989 novel Nemesis. Asimov's science-fictional mentor, John W. Campbell, was fascinated by the idea of telepathy, and as the editor of Astounding Science Fiction, he was able to ensure that his fascination was reflected in the stories his writers wrote and his magazine printed.

In his anthology Before the Golden Age, Asimov wrote that Oceans of Venus was "a conscious imitation of the spirit" of Stanley G. Weinbaum's 1935 story "Parasite Planet", which was also set on Venus.

The brief appearance of Lyman Turner's wife in chapter 7 is the only female character to appear in the entire Lucky Starr series.

== Reception ==
Writing in The New York Times, Villiers Gerson praised the novel as "crackling with suspense, lit by humor, sparkling with complexities of plot, and alive with interest". Reviewer Groff Conklin found Oceans of Venus a cut above the series's first two installments, calling it "a colorful and exciting tale. . . . [A] real thriller for fans of all ages." Anthony Boucher similarly reported Oceans an improvement over the series's previous installments, singling out its "combining plausible adventure, interesting alien life-forms and a sound detective story." P. Schuyler Miller also reviewed the novel favorably, ranking it with Robert A. Heinlein's juveniles.

== Adaptation ==
In 1991 the story was adapted as a comic book by Fernando Fernández.
