= Lucky Starr and the Pirates of the Asteroids =

1953 novel by Isaac Asimov

- First edition cover
- Author: Isaac Asimov
- Cover artist: Richard Powers
- Language: English
- Series: Lucky Starr series
- Genre: Science fiction novel
- Publisher: Doubleday & Company
- Publication date: November 1953
- Publication place: United States
- Media type: Print (hardback & paperback)
- Pages: 188
- OCLC: 63078051
- Preceded by: David Starr, Space Ranger
- Followed by: Lucky Starr and the Oceans of Venus

Lucky Starr and the Pirates of the Asteroids is the second novel in the Lucky Starr series, six juvenile science fiction novels by Isaac Asimov that originally appeared under the pseudonym Paul French. The novel was first published by Doubleday & Company in November 1953.

== Plot summary ==
A year has passed since the events in David Starr, Space Ranger. In that time the spaceship TSS Waltham Zachary has been taken and gutted by pirates based in the asteroid belt. Because David "Lucky" Starr harbors a personal dislike of the pirates for their murder of his parents, he has devised a plan whereby the unmanned survey ship Atlas, as soon as the pirates capture it and bring it to their hidden base, will explode. Unknown to anyone, Starr has leaked the plan to the pirates and sneaked aboard the ship, believing an infiltration will be a more efficient way to bring down the pirates.

When captured, Starr tells the pirate leader, Captain Anton, that his name is Williams (his alias from David Starr, Space Ranger), and offers to join the pirates; whereupon Anton has Starr fight a duel in open space to prove himself worthy. Starr wins the duel, but remains a prisoner aboard Atlas while it is brought to an anonymous asteroid.

The asteroid is home to a hermit named Joseph Patrick Hansen, and the pirates leave Starr in Hansen's care. Hansen tells Starr that he purchased the asteroid as a vacation site, and gradually made it more comfortable over the years, but now depends on the pirates for supplies, and later recognizes the pretended "Williams" as Lawrence Starr's son. Starr admits his true identity, and Hansen convinces him to pilot them to Ceres.

On Ceres, Starr plans to send his friend Bigman to infiltrate the pirates, but realizes that Hansen's asteroid is not where it should be. Starr and Bigman take their own spaceship Shooting Starr to search for it and eventually land on its surface, where Starr is captured by Dingo, the pirate he beat in the duel. Dingo takes him inside the asteroid, revealing a hyperatomic engine used to move it. A fight with Dingo ends when Starr is struck with a neuronic whip and loses consciousness.

Starr wakes to find himself in a spacesuit on the surface of the asteroid; whereupon Dingo straps him to a catapult and flings him into space. He uses his oxygen reserve to reverse his course and return to the asteroid, where he and Bigman defeat some of the pirates. As they leave the pirates' asteroid, they learn that a pirate fleet is attacking Ceres.

Returning to Ceres, Starr realizes that the pirates' real object was to capture Hansen, which they have accomplished, and learns that Captain Anton's ship is taking Hansen to a secret Sirian base on Ganymede, whence the Sirians plan to attack Earth while Earth's fleet is occupied fighting the pirates in the Asteroid Belt. Although Anton has a 12-hour head start, Starr passes him to Ganymede by skimming the Shooting Starr past the Sun, wearing the Martian "Space Ranger" mask to ward off the heat and radiation.

When Anton makes for Ganymede, Starr threatens to ram his ship, and accelerates toward it, all the while talking to Anton. The ships are ten miles apart when Hansen kills Anton and orders Anton's crew to surrender to Starr.

When the Terran fleet arrives to take custody of the pirate ship, Starr convinces the commanding admiral to concentrate on the asteroid pirates and leave the Sirian base on Ganymede alone, revealing that Hansen is the leader of the asteroid pirates. It is then revealed that while Starr was intercepting Anton's ship, the Council of Science, on Starr's orders, captured the base and achieved the wherewithal to terminate the asteroid piracy. Hansen is coerced to have the Sirians leave Ganymede, and is sent to incarceration on Mercury. Afterwards, Starr reveals that the matter between him and Hansen was not just about the latter being the pirate mastermind, but a far more personal one. Hansen claimed to have met David's father, but didn't recognize his two close friends (despite the three being all but inseparable), and claimed that David resembles his father the most when he is angry, despite Lawrence hardly ever being in that state. From that, David states that within an hour after meeting Hansen, he knew he was facing not his father's acquaintance, but his parents' murderer.

== Reception ==
Writing in The New York Times, Sidney Lohman praised Pirates as "grand science fiction for all ages." Reviewer Groff Conklin described the novel as "almost entirely conceived in the straight gee-whiz adventure technique that is the classical pattern for teenage adventure stories", and not as "cruel and bloody" as the first Lucky Starr book, so "Excellent for the Junior set". Astounding reviewer P. Schuyler Miller described it as "fast-moving space opera of a type we all know, with no particular regard for scientific plausibility."

== Themes ==
Lucky Starr and the Pirates of the Asteroids introduces the Sirians as the main threat to Earth, and marks Starr's transformation from his masked crime-fighter role of the first novel to a Cold War-like secret agent.The novel contains the first hints of an overpopulated Earth facing the hostility of the younger worlds of the Galaxy. From Chapter 6:

The food was good, but strange. It was yeast-base material, the kind only the Terrestrial Empire produced. Nowhere else in the Galaxy was the pressure of population so great, the billions of people so numerous, that yeast culture had been developed.
