= List of Bradley Cooper performances =

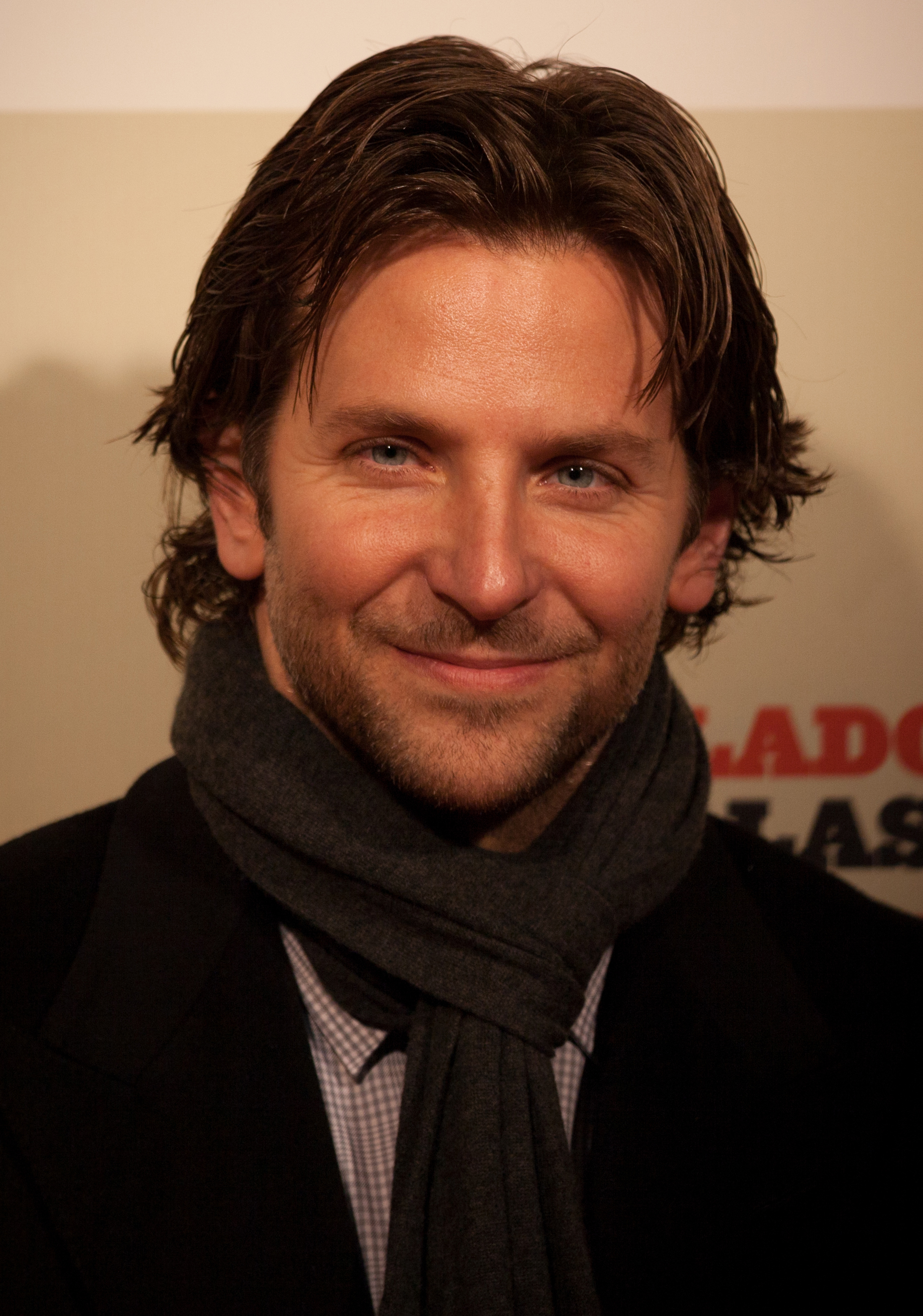
Cooper at the Spain premiere of Silver Linings Playbook in 2013

Bradley Cooper is an American actor and filmmaker. He began his professional career by appearing in an episode of the sitcom Sex and the City (1999) and as the host of the tourism show Globe Trekker the following year. He made his film debut in Wet Hot American Summer (2001) as a gay counselor—a role he later reprised in the web television series Wet Hot American Summer: First Day of Camp (2015). In the action television series Alias (2001–2006), Cooper achieved some success for the supporting role of Will Tippin, although he only played a major role in the series for the first few seasons.

Cooper's supporting part in the commercially successful comedy Wedding Crashers (2005) improved his career prospects, but also led to him being typecast as the best friend to the main character in such comedies as Failure to Launch (2006), The Rocker (2008), and He's Just Not That Into You (2009). During this period, Cooper also continued starring in television shows, such as the 2005 sitcom Kitchen Confidential, and played a dual role in a 2006 onstage production of Three Days of Rain. However, the former was cancelled after four episodes due to low ratings. His breakthrough came with the role of a reckless teacher in Todd Phillips' comedy The Hangover (2009), which became one of the highest grossing R-rated films of all time. Cooper continued to take on parts in several box office hits, including The A-Team (2010), Limitless, and The Hangover Part II (both in 2011).

Cooper appeared in four films in 2012, including the critically acclaimed The Place Beyond the Pines and Silver Linings Playbook. His performance in the latter in particular was widely praised, and earned him a nomination for an Academy Award for Best Actor, among other awards. Cooper's profile continued to expand as he took on major roles in several successful films—American Hustle (2013), Guardians of the Galaxy, and American Sniper (both in 2014). After receiving Academy Award nominations for American Hustle and American Sniper, he became the tenth actor in history to receive an Academy Award nomination in three consecutive years. (Note: Other actors who have received nominations in three consecutive years include: Spencer Tracy, Gary Cooper, Gregory Peck, Marlon Brando, Richard Burton, Al Pacino, Jack Nicholson, William Hurt, and Russell Crowe.) Cooper returned to stage work for a 2014 Broadway production of The Elephant Man, where he played the severely deformed Joseph Merrick. His performance drew praise from critics, and earned him a nomination for the Tony Award for Best Actor in a Play. None of his 2015 films—Aloha, Burnt, or Joy—performed particularly well at the box office. In 2016, he appeared in the comedy drama War Dogs that he also co-produced under his and Philips' production company, Joint Effort.

In 2018, Cooper directed his first film with the highly successful musical romantic drama A Star Is Born, in which he also starred, and contributed to its writing, production, and soundtrack (alongside Lady Gaga). The soundtrack topped the charts in the UK and Ireland, and included the single "Shallow", which also peaked at number one in Ireland. In 2019, Cooper produced the psychological thriller Joker, based on the DC Comics character of the same name. It became the first R-rated film to pass the billion-dollar mark.

== Film ==
Key
†	Denotes works that have not yet been released

Year	Title	Role(s)	Notes	Ref.
2001	Wet Hot American Summer	Ben		
2002	Changing Lanes	Gordon Pinella	Deleted scene	
2002	My Little Eye	Travis Patterson		
2002	Bending All the Rules	Jeff		
2005	Wedding Crashers	Zachary "Sack" Lodge		
2006	Failure to Launch	Demo		
2007	The Comebacks	Cowboy		
2008	Older than America	Luke		
2008	The Rocker	Trash		
2008	The Midnight Meat Train	Leon Kaufman		
2008	Yes Man	Peter		
2009	He's Just Not That Into You	Ben		
2009	The Hangover	Phil Wenneck		
2009	Case 39	Douglas Ames		
2009	All About Steve	Steve		
2009	New York, I Love You	Gus	Appears in the segment directed by Allen Hughes.	
2010	Valentine's Day	Holden		
2010	Brother's Justice	Himself / Dwight Sage (Note: Cooper portrayed two characters.)		
2010	The A-Team	Templeton Peck		
2011	Limitless	Eddie Morra	Also executive producer	
2011	The Hangover Part II	Phil Wenneck	also contributed to the film's soundtrack	
2011	Kaylien	Father Human	Short film	
2012	The Words	Rory Jansen	Also executive producer	
2012	Hit and Run	Alex Dimitri		
2012	The Place Beyond the Pines	Avery Cross		
2012	Silver Linings Playbook	Patrizio "Pat" Solitano, Jr.	Also executive producer	
2013	The Hangover Part III	Phil Wenneck		
2013	American Hustle	Richie DiMaso	Also executive producer	
2014	Guardians of the Galaxy	Rocket	Voice	
2014	Serena	George Pemberton		
2014	American Sniper	Chris Kyle	Also producer	
2015	Aloha	Brian Gilcrest		
2015	Burnt	Adam Jones		
2015	Joy	Neil Walker		
2016	10 Cloverfield Lane	Ben	Voice	
2016	War Dogs	Henry Girard	Also producer	
2017	Guardians of the Galaxy Vol. 2	Rocket	Voice and motion capture	
2018	Avengers: Infinity War	Rocket	Voice	
2018	A Star Is Born	Jackson Maine	Also director, writer, and producer	
2018	The Mule	Colin Bates		
2019	Avengers: Endgame	Rocket	Voice	
2019	Joker	—N/a	Producer	
2021	Licorice Pizza	Jon Peters		
2021	Nightmare Alley	Stanton "Stan" Carlisle	Also producer	
2022	Thor: Love and Thunder	Rocket	Voice	
2023	Dungeons & Dragons: Honor Among Thieves	Marlamin	Cameo	
2023	Guardians of the Galaxy Vol. 3	Rocket	Voice	
2023	Maestro	Leonard Bernstein	Also director, writer, and producer	
2024	IF	Ice	Voice	
2025	Superman	Jor-El	Cameo	
2025	Is This Thing On?	Balls	Also director, writer, and producer	
2027	Untitled Ocean's Eleven prequel †	TBA	Also director, writer, and producer	
2027	Ally †	TBA	Voice, in-production	

== Television ==
Year	Title	Role	Notes	Ref.
1999	Sex and the City	Jake	Episode: "They Shoot Single People, Don't They?"	
2000	Wall to Wall Records	Unknown	Television film	
2000–2001	The Street	Clay Hammond	5 episodes	
2000–2001	Globe Trekker	Himself	9 episodes	
2001–2006	Alias	Will Tippin	46 episodes	
2003	The Last Cowboy	Morgan Murphy	Television film	
2003	Miss Match	Gary	Episode: "I Got You Babe"	
2004	I Want to Marry Ryan Banks	Todd Doherty	Television film	
2004	Touching Evil	Mark Rivers	6 episodes	
2004–2005	Jack & Bobby	Tom Wexler Graham	14 episodes	
2005	Law & Order: Special Victims Unit	Jason Whitaker	Episode: "Night"	
2005	Law & Order: Trial by Jury	Jason Whitaker	Episode: "Day"	
2005–2006	Kitchen Confidential	Jack Bourdain	13 episodes	
2007–2009	Nip/Tuck	Aidan Stone	6 episodes	
2009, 2013	Saturday Night Live	Host / Himself	Episodes: "Bradley Cooper/TV on the Radio" "Zach Galifianakis/Of Monsters and Men"	
2015	Wet Hot American Summer: First Day of Camp	Ben	7 episodes	
2015–2016	Limitless	Eddie Morra	4 episodes, also executive producer	
2022–2023	I Am Groot	Rocket	Voice, 2 Episodes	
2022	The Guardians of the Galaxy Holiday Special	Rocket	Voice, TV special	
2023	Marvel Studios: Assembled	Himself	Episode: "The Making of Guardians of the Galaxy Vol. 3 "	
2023	FDR	—N/a	Executive producer	
2023	Running Wild with Bear Grylls	Himself	Season 8 Episode 1	
2024	Abbott Elementary	Himself	Episode: "Willard R. Abbott"	
2025	The Righteous Gemstones	Elijah Gemstone	Episode: "Prelude"	

== Stage ==
Year	Title	Role	Venue	Ref.
2006	Three Days of Rain	Pip/Theo	Bernard B. Jacobs Theatre	
2008	The Understudy	Jake	Williamstown Theatre Festival	
2014–2015	The Elephant Man	John Merrick	Booth Theatre / Theatre Royal, Haymarket	

== Discography ==
=== Soundtrack albums ===
List of soundtrack albums, with selected chart positions, sales figures and certifications
Title	Album details	Peak chart positions										Sales	Certifications
Title	Album details	US	AUS	AUT	CAN	FRA	GER	ITA	NZ	SWI	UK	Sales	Certifications
A Star Is Born (with Lady Gaga)	Released: October 5, 2018; Label: Interscope; Formats: CD, digital download, LP	1	1	2	1	1	4	4	1	1	1	WW: 6,000,000; US: 1,148,000; CAN: 157,000; FRA: 340,000; UK: 544,913	RIAA: 2× Platinum; ARIA: 3× Platinum; BPI: Platinum; FIMI: 2× Platinum; IFPI AUT: Platinum; IFPI SWI: Platinum; MC: 3× Platinum; RMNZ: 3× Platinum; SNEP: Diamond

=== Singles ===
List of singles as lead artist, with selected chart positions and certifications, showing year released and album name
Title	Year	Peak chart positions										Certifications	Album
Title	Year	US	AUT	CAN	FRA	GER	IRE	NL	SWE	SWI	UK	Certifications	Album
"Shallow" (with Lady Gaga)	2018	1	1	1	3	4	1	5	1	1	1	RIAA: 4× Platinum; ARIA: 16× Platinum; BPI: 5× Platinum; BVMI: Platinum; FIMI: 6× Platinum; IFPI AUT: Platinum; IFPI SWI: 2× Platinum; MC: 8× Platinum; RMNZ: 3× Platinum; SNEP: Diamond	A Star Is Born

=== Other charted and certified songs ===
List of other charted songs, with selected chart positions, showing year released and album name
Title	Year	Peak chart positions					Certifications	Album
Title	Year	US	US Digital	CAN	CAN Digital	SWI	Certifications	Album
"Black Eyes"	2018	—	34	—	43	—	PMB: Gold	A Star Is Born
"Maybe It's Time"	2018	93	6	86	12	82	RIAA: Gold; PMB: Platinum	A Star Is Born
"Out of Time"	2018	—	—	—	—	—	PMB: Gold	A Star Is Born
"Music to My Eyes" (with Lady Gaga)	2018	—	42	—	—	—		A Star Is Born
"Diggin' My Grave" (with Lady Gaga)	2018	—	—	—	—	—	ARIA: Gold	A Star Is Born
"I Don't Know What Love Is" (with Lady Gaga)	2018	—	—	—	—	—	ARIA: Gold	A Star Is Born
"I'll Never Love Again" (with Lady Gaga)	2018	—	—	—	—	—	ARIA: 3× Platinum	A Star Is Born

== Other appearances ==
=== Theme park attractions ===
Title	Year	Role	Venue	Ref.
Guardians of the Galaxy – Mission Breakout!	2017	Rocket (voice)	Disney California Adventure	

== See also ==
- List of awards and nominations received by Bradley Cooper
