= Mask and Bauble Dramatic Society =

Theatre troupe at Georgetown University

- Abbreviation: M&B
- Formation: 1852
- Type: Collegiate theatre troupe
- Legal status: Active
- Purpose: Student-run alternative
- Headquarters: Stage III, Poulton Hall
- Location: Georgetown University
- Region served: Washington, D.C., United States
- Members: 75+
- Executive Producer: Lainey Lyle
- Associate Producer: Nate Findlay
- Website: www.maskandbauble.org

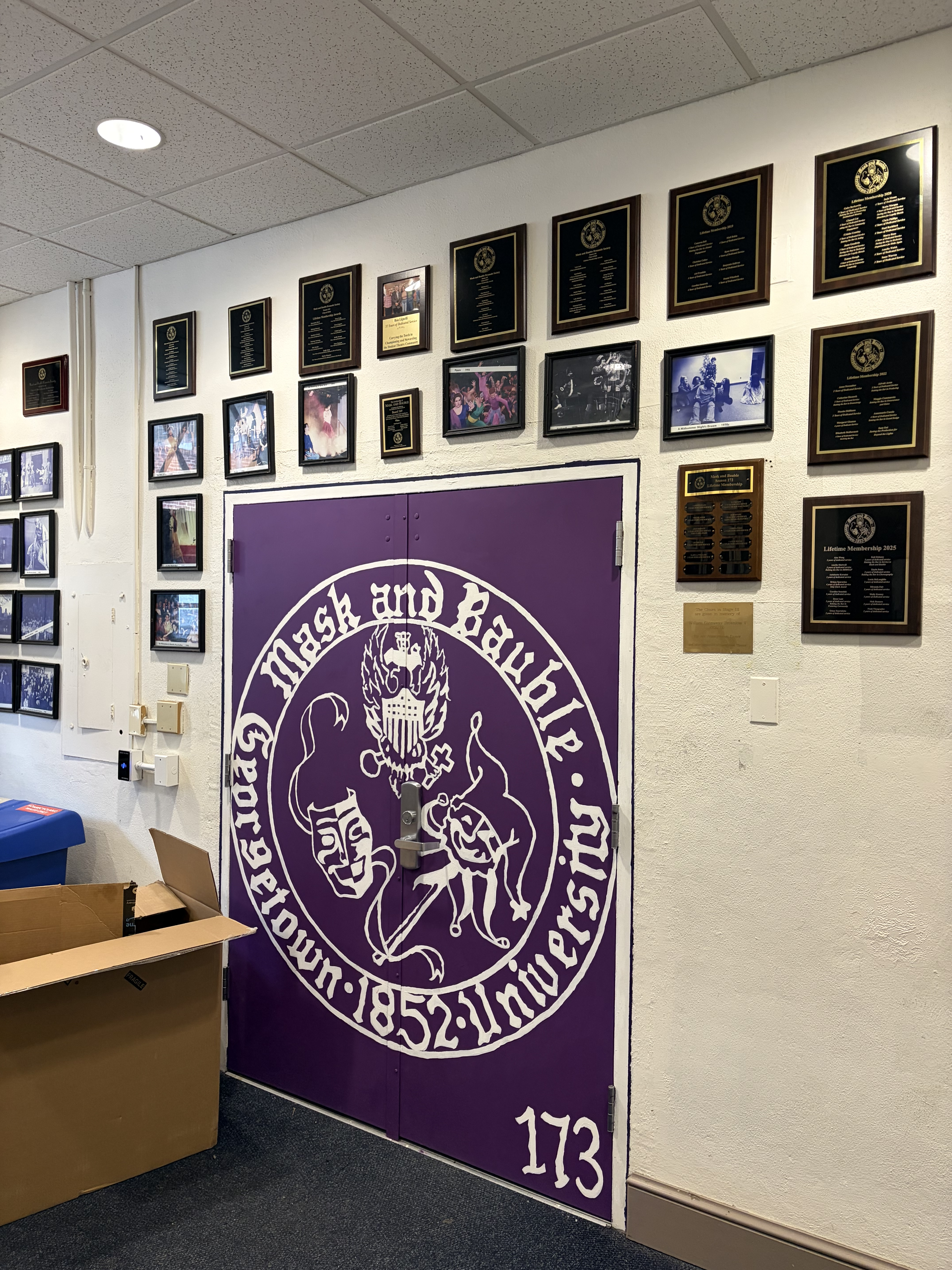
The entrance to the Georgetown University Mask and Bauble Society in Poulton Hall

The Mask and Bauble Dramatic Society of Georgetown University is the oldest continuously running collegiate theatre troupe in the United States. Today, the Society is one of four theatre groups on the Georgetown campus and is entirely student-run. The group continues to provide an opportunity for students to develop artistic, technical, and administrative skills, while performing high-quality theatre in its 174th season.

Mask and Bauble produces three main stage shows annually, including the Donn B. Murphy One-Acts Festival, which focuses on student-written work. All shows are directed, produced, designed, and performed by students.

== History ==
Mask and Bauble was founded in 1852 as The Dramatic Association of Georgetown College, staging its first show, Pizarro, a play by Richard Brinsley Sheridan, on February 27, 1853. World War I priorities caused a suspension of its performances, and after the war the group was revived with the new name of Mask and Bauble. The society was the first of its kind to use female actresses in 1922, as female roles were previously filled by male actors. It formally accepted female members in 1934.

During this time the Society had a close relationship with the Roosevelt White House, with Eleanor Roosevelt as a society patron. During the Eisenhower and Kennedy administrations, student technicians from the group assisted with the technical aspects of some of the nation's first televised presidential press conferences. This intimate relationship with the White House was nurtured by the society's faculty adviser, Donn B. Murphy, who also served as theatrical adviser to Kennedy and Johnson. Murphy served until 1976, although he remained involved with Georgetown theatre. The Society's annual playwright contest and one acts festival bears his name, and promotes student-written plays.

== Today ==
Mask and Bauble performs in Poulton Hall's Stage III, on the Georgetown campus. This theater space, part of the university, was occupied by students from the group over spring break in 1975. Unsatisfied with the university's commitment to theater, they squatted in what was previously Room 57, and built a makeshift theater they named Stage Two. The university forced this to be taken down, but built the group a small theater in Poulton Hall, which became Stage III. Stage One was then converted into the scene and costume shop. While the club's alumni were very active in raising money to build Georgetown's new Davis Performing Arts Center, the society and other student groups have been restricted from using the center's main theatre due to their insistence on maintaining student, rather than faculty, direction. In 2009, Mask & Bauble co-produced Caroline, or Change with the Black Theater Ensemble and the Department of Performing Arts on the main stage of the Davis center, making it the first student directed play on the Gonda Stage.

== Production history ==
2025-2026 (174)

- Night of Musical Scenes
- The Humans by Stephen Karam
- DBMOAF: featuring Saint Skye by Anastasia Kelly, No Fly Zone by Eileen Miller, and The Heir by Lucas Kirkland
- Spring Awakening by Steven Sater and Duncan Sheik

2024-2025 (173)

- Night of Musical Scenes
- The Great Gatsby by F. Scott Fitzgerald, adapted by Simon Levy
- DBMOAF: featuring Six Years Later by Claire Cable, Ouroboros by Anastasia Kelly, and The Enfancia Project by Eileen Miller
- Sweeney Todd: The Demon Barber of Fleet Street by Stephen Sondheim and Hugh Wheeler

2023-2024 (172)

- Night of Musical Scenes
- John Proctor Is the Villain by Kimberly Belflower
- DBMOAF: featuring Note to Self by Malina Brannen, Rewriting by Caitlin Frazier, and The Ultraview by Anastasia Kelly
- Pippin by Stephen Schwartz and Roger O. Hirson (in collaboration with Nomadic Theatre)

2022-2023 (171)

- Night of Musical Scenes
- Love's Labour's Lost by William Shakespeare
- DBMOAF: featuring A Sure Thing by Hiruni Herat, Is There Life On Mars by Sarah Soriano-Martin, and Melpomene By Another Name by Nick Giotis
- Into the Woods by James Lapine and Stephen Sondheim

2021-2022 (170)

- Machinal by Sophie Treadwell
- Beyond the Lights (In collaboration with Black Theatre Ensemble)
- Violet by Jeanine Tesori and Brian Crawley
- DBMOAF: featuring Grand Courses by Nick Giotis, Duty Free As A Way of Coping by Anjali Britto, and Huelga by Catherine Shonack

2020-2021 (169)

- Antigone by Gilbert Murray
- DBMOAF: featuring The Ponderosa by Isaac Warren
- Man of La Mancha by Dale Wasserman, Mitch Leigh, and Joe Darion

2019-2020 (168)

- J.B. by Archibald MacLeish
- DBMOAF: featuring Marblehead, MA by Amelia Walsh
- Hedda Gabler by Patrick Marber

2018-2019 (167)

- DBMOAF: featuring Four Lemons and a Funeral by Allison Lane and Hazel & Stanley by Timmy Sutton
- A Midsummer Night's Dream by William Shakespeare
- Speech & Debate by Stephen Karam (In collaboration with Georgetown University Department of Performing Arts)
- Hello Again by Michael John LaChiusa

2017-2018 (166)

- Rumors by Neil Simon
- DBMOAF: featuring Roots by Devika Ranjan
- Mr. Burns, a Post-Electric Play by Anne Washburn (In collaboration with Nomadic Theatre)
- Footloose by Tom Snow, Dean Pitchford, and Walter Bobbie

2016-2017 (165)

- An American Daughter by Wendy Wasserstein (In collaboration with The Black Theatre Ensemble)
- Wind Me Up, Maria!: A Go-Go Musical by Natsu Onoda Power and Charles "Shorty Corleone" Garris (In collaboration with Georgetown University Department of Performing Arts and The Black Theater Ensemble)
- DBMOAF: featuring Victimology by Rachel Linton and The Gun by Grayson Ullman
- Stupid Fucking Bird by Aaron Posner

2015-2016 (164)

- All My Sons by Arthur Miller
- DBMOAF: featuring Beyond
- Cyrano by Aaron Posner and Michael Hollinger
- Into the Woods by Stephen Sondheim and James Lapine

2014-2015 (163)

- Inherit the Wind by Jerome Lawrence and Robert Edwin Lee
- DBMOAF: featuring Sonder
- Killer Joe by Tracy Letts (in collaboration with Nomadic Theatre)
- Urinetown by Mark Hollmann and Greg Kotis

2013-2014 (162)

- Don't Drink the Water by Woody Allen
- DBMOAF: featuring How To Succeed With Dolls by Tim Lyons
- Proof by David Auburn
- She Loves Me by Jerry Bock, Sheldon Harnick, and Joe Masteroff

2012-2013 (161)

- The History Boys by Alan Bennett
- DBMOAF: featuring Spiritual Ecstasies
- Polk Street by T. Chase Meacham (in collaboration with Nomadic Theatre)
- Spring Awakening by Duncan Sheik and Steven Sater

2011-2012 (160)

- DBMOAF: featuring Peaches and Freon and #Courage
- The Deep Blue Sea by Terence Rattigan
- The 25th Annual Putnam County Spelling Bee by William Finn and Rachel Sheinkin
- Macbeth by William Shakespeare

2010-2011 (159)

- Arsenic and Old Lace by Joseph Kesselring
- DBMOAF: featuring Typhoid Fever
- Sweeney Todd: The Demon Barber of Fleet Street by Stephen Sondheim and Hugh Wheeler
- Rabbit Hole by David Lindsay-Abaire
- Workshops: Trial of God by Elie Wiesel, and Tennessee Williams Night of Scenes

2009-2010 (158)

- No Exit by Jean-Paul Sartre
- Caroline, or Change by Jeanine Tesori and Tony Kushner
- The Real Thing by Tom Stoppard
- DBMOAF: featuring The Hypothetical Detective
- The Taming of the Shrew by William Shakespeare

2008-2009 (157)

- 12 Angry Men
- Raised in Captivity
- The Foreigner
- DBMOAF: featuring Witness
- Jekyll and Hyde

2007-2008 (156)

- Hamlet
- All in the Timing
- Black Comedy
- DBMOAF: featuring In the Mind of a Great Man
- Cabaret

2006-2007 (155)

- The Importance of Being Earnest
- The Glass Menagerie
- Antigone
- DBMOAF: featuring McSwiggen and the Ghost
- A New Brain

2005-2006 (154)

- Much Ado About Nothing
- The Shape of Things
- The Trestle at Pope Lick Creek
- DBMOAF: featuring Chemistry
- Urinetown

2004-2005 (153)

- Aunt Dan and Lemon
- The Love of the Nightingale
- Cloud 9
- DBMOAF: featuring Triptych and Diamonds are a Boy’s Best Friend
- Assassins

== Alumni ==
- John Guare: American playwright, best known for The House of Blue Leaves and Six Degrees of Separation
- Eileen Brennan: American film, television, and stage actress
- John Barrymore: American stage and film actor
- Jack Hofsiss: Director, best known for The Elephant Man
- Antonin Scalia: Supreme Court Justice
- Bradley Cooper: American film and television actor
