= List of awards and nominations received by Bradley Cooper =

Bradley Cooper awards and nominations
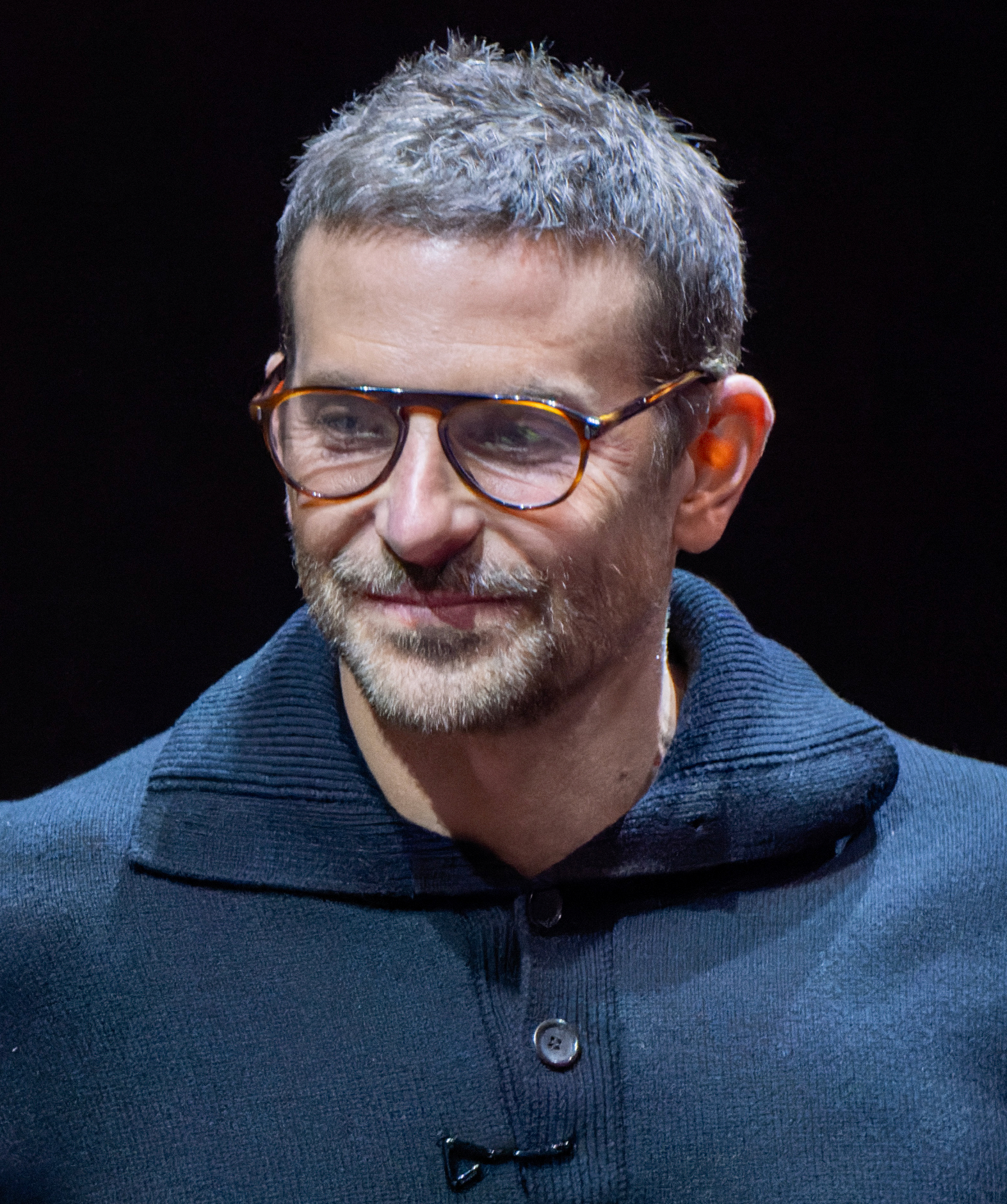
- Cooper in 2023
Awards and nominations
Award	Wins	Nominations
Academy Awards	0	12
BAFTA Awards	1	11
Critics' Choice	4	15
Golden Globes	0	6
Grammy Awards	3	4
SAG Awards	1	7
Tony Awards	0	1

Totals (Note: Certain award groups do not simply award one winner. They acknowledge several different recipients, have runners-up, and have third place. Since this is a specific recognition and is different from losing an award, runner-up mentions are considered wins in this award tally. For simplification and to avoid errors, each award in this list has been presumed to have had a prior nomination.)
- Wins: 54
- Nominations: 220

Bradley Cooper is an American actor and filmmaker. He has received several awards including a British Academy Film Awards, and three Grammy Awards as well as nominations for twelve Academy Awards, six Golden Globe Awards, four Grammy Awards, and one Tony Award. Cooper has also received nominations for four Producers Guild of America Awards, two Directors Guild Awards, one Writers Guild Award, seven Screen Actors Guild Awards. For his work on the A Star Is Born soundtrack, he won a Grammy Award for Best Pop Duo/Group Performance for "Shallow" and a BAFTA Award for Best Film Music, both shared with Lady Gaga.

Cooper's started his career with the cult film Wet Hot American Summer (2001) followed by appearing in supporting roles in comedic films such as Wedding Crashers (2005), Failure to Launch (2006), and Yes Man (2008). His breakthrough performance came in the 2009 comedy The Hangover. Cooper then established himself as a leading man in films such as the romantic comedies He's Just Not That Into You (2009), Valentine's Day (2010), the action film The A-Team (2010), and the drama films Limitless (2011), and The Place Beyond the Pines (2012).

Cooper has gone on to receive Academy Award nominations for his performances as a man with bipolar disorder in the romantic comedy-drama Silver Linings Playbook (2012), an FBI agent in the historical comedy-drama American Hustle (2013), Chris Kyle in the war drama American Sniper (2014), an alcoholic country singer in the musical romance drama A Star is Born (2018), and Leonard Bernstein in the biographical drama Maestro (2023). (Note: Other actors who have received nominations in three consecutive years include: Spencer Tracy, Gary Cooper, Gregory Peck, Marlon Brando, Richard Burton, Al Pacino, Jack Nicholson, William Hurt, and Russell Crowe.) During this time he received five nominations for Best Picture as a producer on Clint Eastwood's American Sniper (2013), A Star is Born (2018), Todd Phillips' Joker (2019), Guillermo del Toro's Nightmare Alley (2021), and Maestro (2023).

Starting in 2014 Cooper has portrayed Rocket in numerous films within the Marvel Cinematic Universe starting with superhero film Guardians of the Galaxy. Cooper made his Broadway debut in Three Days of Rain with Julia Roberts and Paul Rudd in 2006. He portrayed the deformed Joseph Merrick in the revival of The Elephant Man (2015) which garnered more recognition and a Tony Award for Best Actor in a Play nomination.

== Major industry awards ==
=== Academy Awards ===
Year	Category	Nominated work	Result	Ref.
2013	Best Actor	Silver Linings Playbook	Nominated	
2014	Best Supporting Actor	American Hustle	Nominated	
2015	Best Picture	American Sniper	Nominated	
2015	Best Actor	American Sniper	Nominated	
2019	Best Picture	A Star Is Born	Nominated	
2019	Best Actor	A Star Is Born	Nominated	
2019	Best Adapted Screenplay	A Star Is Born	Nominated	
2020	Best Picture	Joker	Nominated	
2022	Best Picture	Nightmare Alley	Nominated	
2024	Best Picture	Maestro	Nominated	
2024	Best Actor	Maestro	Nominated	
2024	Best Original Screenplay	Maestro	Nominated	

=== BAFTA Awards ===
Year	Category	Nominated work	Result	Ref.
British Academy Film Awards
2013	Best Actor in a Leading Role	Silver Linings Playbook	Nominated	
2014	Best Actor in a Supporting Role	American Hustle	Nominated	
2019	Best Film	A Star is Born	Nominated	
2019	Best Director	A Star is Born	Nominated	
2019	Best Actor in a Leading Role	A Star is Born	Nominated	
2019	Best Adapted Screenplay	A Star is Born	Nominated	
2019	Best Film Music	A Star is Born	Won	
2020	Best Film	Joker	Nominated	
2024	Best Director	Maestro	Nominated	
2024	Best Actor in a Leading Role	Maestro	Nominated	
2024	Best Original Screenplay	Maestro	Nominated	

=== Critics' Choice Awards ===
Year	Category	Nominated work	Result	Ref.
Critics' Choice Movie Awards
2013	Best Actor	Silver Linings Playbook	Nominated	
2013	Best Actor in a Comedy	Silver Linings Playbook	Won	
2013	Best Acting Ensemble (Note: Shared with the cast)	Silver Linings Playbook	Won	
2014	Best Supporting Actor	American Hustle	Nominated	
2014	Best Acting Ensemble	American Hustle	Won	
2015	Best Actor in an Action Movie	American Sniper	Won	
2019	Best Picture	A Star is Born	Nominated	
2019	Best Actor	A Star is Born	Nominated	
2019	Best Director	A Star is Born	Nominated	
2019	Best Adapted Screenplay (Note: Shared with Eric Roth and Will Fetters)	A Star is Born	Nominated	
2019	Best Song	"Shallow"	Won	
2020	Best Picture	Joker	Nominated	
2024	Best Picture	Maestro	Nominated	
2024	Best Director	Maestro	Nominated	
2024	Best Actor	Maestro	Nominated	
2024	Best Original Screenplay (Note: Shared with Josh Singer)	Maestro	Nominated	

=== Golden Globe Awards ===
Year	Category	Nominated work	Result	Ref.
2013	Best Actor – Motion Picture Musical or Comedy	Silver Linings Playbook	Nominated	
2014	Best Supporting Actor – Motion Picture	American Hustle	Nominated	
2019	Best Director – Motion Picture	A Star is Born	Nominated	
2019	Best Actor – Motion Picture Drama	A Star is Born	Nominated	
2024	Best Director – Motion Picture	Maestro	Nominated	
2024	Best Actor – Motion Picture Drama	Maestro	Nominated	

=== Grammy Awards ===
Year	Category	Nominated work	Result	Ref.
2019	Record of the Year	"Shallow"	Nominated	
2019	Best Pop Duo/Group Performance	"Shallow"	Won	
2020	Best Compilation Soundtrack for Visual Media	A Star Is Born	Won	
2025	Best Compilation Soundtrack for Visual Media	Maestro	Won	

=== Screen Actors Guild Awards ===
Year	Category	Nominated work	Result	Ref.
2013	Outstanding Ensemble Cast in a Motion Picture	Silver Linings Playbook	Nominated	
2013	Outstanding Actor in a Leading Role	Silver Linings Playbook	Nominated	
2014	Outstanding Ensemble Cast in a Motion Picture	American Hustle	Won	
2019	Outstanding Ensemble Cast in a Motion Picture	A Star is Born	Nominated	
2019	Outstanding Actor in a Leading Role	A Star is Born	Nominated	
2022	Outstanding Actor in a Supporting Role	Licorice Pizza	Nominated	
2024	Outstanding Actor in a Leading Role	Maestro	Nominated	

=== Tony Awards ===
Year	Category	Nominated work	Result	Ref.
2015	Best Actor in a Play	The Elephant Man	Nominated	

== Miscellaneous awards ==
Awards and nominations received by Bradley Cooper
Organizations	Year	Category	Nominated work	Result	Ref.
American Film Institute Awards	2015	Top 10 Films of the Year	American Sniper	Won	
American Film Institute Awards	2019	Top 10 Films of the Year	A Star Is Born	Won	
American Film Institute Awards	2020	Top 10 Films of the Year	Joker	Won	
American Film Institute Awards	2024	Top 10 Films of the Year	Maestro	Won	
American Music Awards	2019	Collaboration of the Year (Note: Shared with Lady Gaga)	"Shallow"	Nominated	
American Music Awards	2019	Favorite Soundtrack	A Star Is Born	Nominated	
AACTA International Awards	2013	Best Actor – International	Silver Linings Playbook	Nominated	
AACTA International Awards	2014	Best Supporting Actor – International	American Hustle	Nominated	
AACTA International Awards	2019	Best Film – International	A Star Is Born	Nominated	
AACTA International Awards	2019	Best Direction – International	A Star Is Born	Nominated	
AACTA International Awards	2019	Best Actor – International	A Star Is Born	Nominated	
AACTA International Awards	2020	Best Film – International	Joker	Nominated	
AACTA International Awards	2024	Best Direction – International	Maestro	Nominated	
AACTA International Awards	2024	Best Actor – International	Maestro	Nominated	
AACTA International Awards	2024	Best Screenplay – International	Maestro	Nominated	
AARP Movies for Grownups Awards	2019	Best Picture	A Star Is Born	Nominated	
AARP Movies for Grownups Awards	2019	Readers' Choice Poll	A Star Is Born	Won	
AARP Movies for Grownups Awards	2020	Readers' Choice Poll	Joker	Nominated	
AARP Movies for Grownups Awards	2022	Best Ensemble	Nightmare Alley	Won	
AARP Movies for Grownups Awards	2024	Best Movie for Grownups	Maestro	Nominated	
AARP Movies for Grownups Awards	2024	Best Time Capsule	Maestro	Won	
American Cinematheque Award	2018	Award Honoree	—N/a	Won	
Astra Film Awards	2024	Best Picture	Maestro	Nominated	
Astra Film Awards	2024	Best Director	Maestro	Nominated	
Astra Film Awards	2024	Best Actor	Maestro	Nominated	
Astra Film Awards	2024	Guardians of the Galaxy Vol. 3	Best Voice-Over Performance	Nominated	
Billboard Music Awards	2019	Chart Achievement	A Star Is Born	Nominated	
Billboard Music Awards	2019	Top Soundtrack	A Star Is Born	Nominated	
Billboard Music Awards	2019	Top Selling Song	"Shallow"	Nominated	
Bodil Awards	2019	Best American Film	A Star Is Born	Nominated	
Capri Hollywood International Film Festival	2012	Best Actor	Silver Linings Playbook	Won	
Capri Hollywood International Film Festival	2012	Best Ensemble Cast	Silver Linings Playbook	Won	
Capri Hollywood International Film Festival	2024	Visionary Award	Maestro	Won	
Capri Hollywood International Film Festival	2024	Producers of the Year (Note: Shared with Martin Scorsese, Steven Spielberg, Fred Berner, Amy Durning and Kristie Macosko Krieger)	Maestro	Won	
Danish Music Awards	2019	International Hit of the Year	"Shallow"	Won	
Dorian Awards	2013	Film Performance of the Year	Silver Linings Playbook	Nominated	
Dorian Awards	2019	Film of the Year	A Star Is Born	Nominated	
Dorian Awards	2019	Film Performance of the Year – Actor	A Star Is Born	Nominated	
Dorian Awards	2019	Wilde Artist of the Year	A Star Is Born	Nominated	
Dorian Awards	2020	TV Musical Performance of the Year	"Shallow" at the 91st Academy Awards	Won	
Directors Guild of America Awards	2019	Outstanding Directorial Achievement in Motion Pictures	A Star Is Born	Nominated	
Directors Guild of America Awards	2019	Outstanding Directing of a First-Time Feature Film	A Star Is Born	Nominated	
Drama Desk Awards	2015	Outstanding Actor in a Play	The Elephant Man	Nominated	
Drama League Awards	2015	Distinguished Performance	The Elephant Man	Nominated	
Elle Style Awards	2013	Best Actor	Himself	Won	
Empire Awards	2015	Best Actor	American Sniper	Nominated	
Fryderyk	2019	Best Foreign Album	A Star Is Born	Nominated	
Golden Eagle Awards	2019	Best Foreign Language Film	A Star Is Born	Nominated	
Golden Raspberry Awards	2010	Worst Screen Couple (Note: Shared with Sandra Bullock)	All About Steve	Won	
Golden Schmoes Awards	2012	Best Actor of the Year	Silver Linings Playbook	Nominated	
Golden Schmoes Awards	2013	Best Supporting Actor of the Year	American Hustle	Nominated	
Golden Schmoes Awards	2018	Best Actor of the Year	A Star Is Born	Nominated	
Gotham Awards	2012	Best Ensemble Performance	Silver Linings Playbook	Nominated	
Gotham Awards	2023	Cultural Icon & Creator Tribute	Maestro	Won	
GQ Men of the Year Awards	2011	International Man Award	—N/a	Won	
Grande Prêmio do Cinema Brasileiro	2019	Best Foreign Feature Film (Note: People's Choice)	A Star Is Born	Won	
Hollywood Film Awards	2009	Comedy Actor of the Year	The Hangover	Won	
Hollywood Film Awards	2012	Actor of the Year	Silver Linings Playbook	Won	
Hollywood Music in Media Awards	2018	Best Soundtrack Album	A Star Is Born	Nominated	
Hollywood Music in Media Awards	2018	Best Original Song – Feature Film	"Shallow"	Won	
Hungarian Music Awards	2019	Foreign Pop-Rock Album of the Year	A Star Is Born	Won	
Independent Spirit Awards	2012	Best Male Lead	Silver Linings Playbook	Nominated	
Irish Film & Television Academy	2013	Best International Actor	Silver Linings Playbook	Nominated	
Jupiter Award	2016	Best International Actor	American Sniper	Nominated	
Jupiter Award	2019	Best International Film	A Star Is Born	Nominated	
MTV Millennial Awards	2019	Global Hit ("Shallow")	A Star Is Born	Nominated	
MTV Millennial Awards Brazil	2019	Global Hit ("Shallow")	A Star Is Born	Won	
MTV Millennial Awards Brazil	2019	Ship of the Year	A Star Is Born	Nominated	
MTV Movie & TV Awards	2010	Best Comedic Performance	The Hangover	Nominated	
MTV Movie & TV Awards	2013	Best Male Performance	Silver Linings Playbook	Won	
MTV Movie & TV Awards	2013	Best Kiss (Note: Shared with Jennifer Lawrence)	Silver Linings Playbook	Won	
MTV Movie & TV Awards	2013	Best Musical Moment	Silver Linings Playbook	Won	
MTV Movie & TV Awards	2014	Best Male Performance	American Hustle	Nominated	
MTV Movie & TV Awards	2015	Best Male Performance	American Sniper	Won	
MTV Movie & TV Awards	2015	Best On-Screen Duo (Note: Shared with Vin Diesel)	Guardians of the Galaxy	Nominated	
MTV Movie & TV Awards	2019	Best Musical Moment	A Star Is Born	Won	
MTV Video Music Awards	2019	Song of the Year	"Shallow"	Nominated	
MTV Video Music Awards	2019	Best Collaboration	"Shallow"	Nominated	
NRJ Music Awards	2019	International Duo/Group of the Year	Lady Gaga & Bradley Cooper	Won	
Outer Critics Circle Awards	2015	Outstanding Actor in a Play	The Elephant Man	Nominated	
Palm Springs International Film Festival	2013	Desert Palm Achievement Award	Silver Linings Playbook	Won	
Palm Springs International Film Festival	2014	Ensemble Cast Award	American Hustle	Won	
Palm Springs International Film Festival	2018	Director of the Year Award	A Star Is Born	Won	
People's Choice Awards	2011	Favorite Action Star	The A-Team	Nominated	
People's Choice Awards	2012	Favorite Comedic Movie Actor	The Hangover Part II	Nominated	
People's Choice Awards	2013	Favorite Dramatic Movie Actor	Silver Linings Playbook	Nominated	
People's Choice Awards	2014	Favorite Comedic Movie Actor	The Hangover Part III	Nominated	
Producers Guild of America Awards	2015	Best Theatrical Motion Picture	American Sniper	Nominated	
Producers Guild of America Awards	2019	Best Theatrical Motion Picture	A Star is Born	Nominated	
Producers Guild of America Awards	2020	Best Theatrical Motion Picture	Joker	Nominated	
Producers Guild of America Awards	2024	Best Theatrical Motion Picture	Maestro	Nominated	
Robert Award	2019	Best American Film	A Star Is Born	Nominated	
Russian National Movie Award	2015	Georges Award – Best Foreign Hero of the Year	Guardians of the Galaxy	Nominated	
Santa Barbara International Film Festival	2024	Outstanding Performer of the Year Award	Maestro	Won	
Satellite Awards	2009	Best Actor – Motion Picture Musical or Comedy	The Hangover	Nominated	
Satellite Awards	2012	Best Actor – Motion Picture	Silver Linings Playbook	Won	
Satellite Awards	2013	Best Supporting Actor – Motion Picture	American Hustle	Nominated	
Satellite Awards	|2018	Best Motion Picture – Comedy/Musical (Note: Nominated as producer)	A Star Is Born	Won	
Satellite Awards	|2018	Best Actor – Motion Picture Musical or Comedy	A Star Is Born	Nominated	
Satellite Awards	|2018	Best Director	A Star Is Born	Nominated	
Satellite Awards	|2018	Best Adapted Screenplay (Note: Shared with Eric Roth)	A Star Is Born	Nominated	
Satellite Awards	2019	Best Motion Picture – Drama	Joker	Nominated	
Satellite Awards	2024	Best Motion Picture – Drama	Maestro	Nominated	
Satellite Awards	2024	Best Actor in a Motion Picture – Drama	Maestro	Nominated	
Satellite Awards	2024	Best Original Screenplay	Maestro	Won	
ShoWest Convention, USA	2009	Special Award – Comedy Star of the Year	The Hangover	Won	
Swiss Music Awards	2020	Best International Hit	"Shallow"	Won	
TEC Awards	2020	Record Production – Album	A Star Is Born	Won	
Teen Choice Awards	2009	Choice Movie: Rockstar Moment (Note: Shared with Ed Helms, Zach Galifianakis, and Mike Tyson)	The Hangover	Nominated	
Teen Choice Awards	2009	Choice Summer Movie Star: Male	The Hangover	Nominated	
Teen Choice Awards	2011	Choice Movie Actor: Drama	Limitless	Nominated	
Teen Choice Awards	2011	Choice Movie: Chemistry (Note: Shared with Ed Helms & Zach Galifianakis)	The Hangover Part II	Nominated	
Teen Choice Awards	2013	Choice Movie Actor: Drama	The Words	Nominated	
Teen Choice Awards	2014	Choice Movie Actor: Drama	American Hustle	Nominated	
Teen Choice Awards	2015	Choice Movie Actor: Comedy	Aloha	Nominated	
Teen Choice Awards	2019	Choice Movie Actor: Drama	A Star Is Born	Nominated	
Teen Choice Awards	2019	Choice Collaboration	A Star Is Born	Nominated	
Teen Choice Awards	2019	Choice Song From a Movie	A Star Is Born	Nominated	
Teen Choice Awards	2019	Choice Ship	A Star Is Born	Nominated	
Venice International Film Festival	2018	Smithers Foundation Award	A Star Is Born	Won	
Venice International Film Festival	2023	Golden Lion	Maestro	Nominated	
Writers Guild of America Awards	2019	Best Adapted Screenplay	A Star is Born	Nominated	

== Critics associations ==
Awards and nominations received by Bradley Cooper
Organizations	Year	Category	Nominated work	Result	Ref.
African-American Film Critics Association	2018	Top Ten Films	A Star Is Born	Won	
Austin Film Critics Association	2018	Best Actor	A Star Is Born	Nominated	
Austin Film Critics Association	2018	Best First Film	A Star Is Born	Nominated	
Alliance of Women Film Journalists	2012	Most Egregious Age Difference Between The; Leading Man and The Love Interest	Silver Linings Playbook	Nominated	
Alliance of Women Film Journalists	2023	Best Actor	Maestro	Nominated	
Chicago Film Critics Association	2018	Best Film	A Star is Born	Nominated	
Chicago Film Critics Association	2018	Best Director	A Star is Born	Nominated	
Chicago Film Critics Association	2018	Best Actor	A Star is Born	Nominated	
Chicago Film Critics Association	2018	Best Adapted Screenplay	A Star is Born	Nominated	
Chicago Film Critics Association	2018	Most Promising Filmmaker	A Star is Born	Nominated	
Dallas–Fort Worth Film Critics Association	2018	Best Film	A Star is Born	Won	
Dallas–Fort Worth Film Critics Association	2018	Best Director	A Star is Born	Runner-up	
Dallas–Fort Worth Film Critics Association	2018	Best Actor	A Star is Born	3rd place	
Dallas–Fort Worth Film Critics Association	2023	Best Film	Maestro	7th place	
Dallas–Fort Worth Film Critics Association	2023	Best Actor	Maestro	3rd place	
Detroit Film Critics Society	2009	Best Ensemble	The Hangover	Won	
Detroit Film Critics Society	2012	Best Actor	Silver Linings Playbook	Nominated	
Detroit Film Critics Society	2012	Best Ensemble	Silver Linings Playbook	Nominated	
Detroit Film Critics Society	2013	Best Ensemble	American Hustle	Won	
Detroit Film Critics Society	2014	Best Ensemble	Guardians of the Galaxy	Won	
Detroit Film Critics Society	2015	Best Ensemble	Joy	Nominated	
Detroit Film Critics Society	2018	Best Director	A Star is Born	Nominated	
Detroit Film Critics Society	2018	Best Actor	A Star is Born	Nominated	
Dublin Film Critics' Circle	2018	Best Film	A Star is Born	Won	
Dublin Film Critics' Circle	2018	Best Actor	A Star is Born	Won	
Dublin Film Critics' Circle	2018	Best Director	A Star is Born	3rd place	
Dublin Film Critics' Circle	2019	Best Picture	Joker	4th place	
Dublin Film Critics' Circle	2023	Best Director	Maestro	10th place	
Dublin Film Critics' Circle	2023	Best Actor	Maestro	3rd place	
Florida Film Critics Circle	2018	Best First Film	A Star is Born	Nominated	
Florida Film Critics Circle	2023	Best Actor	Maestro	Runner-up	
Georgia Film Critics Association	2012	Best Actor	Silver Linings Playbook	Nominated	
Georgia Film Critics Association	2013	Best Supporting Actor	American Hustle	Nominated	
Georgia Film Critics Association	2018	Best Picture	A Star is Born	Won	
Georgia Film Critics Association	2018	Best Director	A Star is Born	Nominated	
Georgia Film Critics Association	2018	Best Actor	A Star is Born	Nominated	
Georgia Film Critics Association	2018	Best Adapted Screenplay	A Star is Born	Nominated	
Georgia Film Critics Association	2022	Best Actor	Maestro	Nominated	
Hollywood Critics Association	2019	Best Picture	Joker	Nominated	
Houston Film Critics Society	2018	Best Picture	A Star is Born	Nominated	
Houston Film Critics Society	2018	Best Director	A Star is Born	Nominated	
Houston Film Critics Society	2018	Best Actor	A Star is Born	Nominated	
Houston Film Critics Society	2019	Best Picture	Joker	Nominated	
IndieWire Critics Poll	2018	Best First Feature	A Star is Born	4th place	
London Film Critics' Circle	2019	Film of the Year	Joker	Nominated	
London Film Critics' Circle	2023	Actor of the Year	Maestro	Nominated	
Los Angeles Online Film Critics Society	2018	Best Picture	A Star is Born	Nominated	
Los Angeles Online Film Critics Society	2018	Best Actor	A Star is Born	Nominated	
Los Angeles Online Film Critics Society	2018	Best Adapted Screenplay (Note: Shared with Eric Roth)	A Star is Born	Nominated	
Los Angeles Online Film Critics Society	2018	Best Male Director	A Star is Born	Nominated	
Los Angeles Online Film Critics Society	2018	Best First Feature	A Star is Born	Nominated	
National Board of Review	2012	Best Actor	Silver Linings Playbook	Won	
National Board of Review	2018	Top Ten Films	A Star is Born	Won	
National Board of Review	2018	Best Director	A Star is Born	Won	
New York Film Critics Online	2014	Best Ensemble Cast	American Hustle	Won	
New York Film Critics Online	2018	Top 10 Films	A Star is Born	Won	
New York Film Critics Online	2019	Top Ten Films	Joker	Won	
Online Film Critics Society	2018	Best Picture	A Star is Born	Nominated	
Online Film Critics Society	2018	Best Actor	A Star is Born	Nominated	
Online Film Critics Society	2018	Best Debut Feature	A Star is Born	Nominated	
San Diego Film Critics Society	2012	Best Actor	Silver Linings Playbook	Nominated	
San Diego Film Critics Society	2012	Best Performance by an Ensemble	Silver Linings Playbook	Nominated	
San Diego Film Critics Society	2013	Best Ensemble	American Hustle	Won	
San Diego Film Critics Society	2019	Best Picture	Joker	Nominated	
San Francisco Bay Area Film Critics Circle	2023	Best Actor	Maestro	Nominated	
Seattle Film Critics Society	2013	Best Ensemble Cast	American Hustle	Won	
Seattle Film Critics Society	2018	Best Picture	A Star is Born	Nominated	
Seattle Film Critics Society	2018	Best Actor	A Star is Born	Nominated	
Seattle Film Critics Society	2018	Best Director	A Star is Born	Nominated	
St. Louis Film Critics Association	2012	Best Actor	Silver Linings Playbook	Nominated	
St. Louis Film Critics Association	2018	Best Film	A Star is Born	Won	
St. Louis Film Critics Association	2018	Best Actor	A Star is Born	Nominated	
St. Louis Film Critics Association	2018	Best Director	A Star is Born	Nominated	
St. Louis Film Critics Association	2018	Best Adapted Screenplay	A Star is Born	Nominated	
St. Louis Film Critics Association	2023	Best Film	Maestro	Nominated	
St. Louis Film Critics Association	2023	Best Actor	Maestro	Nominated	
Vancouver Film Critics Circle	2013	Best Supporting Actor	American Hustle	Nominated	
Washington D.C. Area Film Critics Association	2013	Best Ensemble	American Hustle	Nominated	
Washington D.C. Area Film Critics Association	2017	Best Voice Performance	Guardians of the Galaxy Vol. 2	Nominated	
Washington D.C. Area Film Critics Association	2018	Best Film	A Star is Born	Nominated	
Washington D.C. Area Film Critics Association	2018	Best Actor	A Star is Born	Won	
Washington D.C. Area Film Critics Association	2018	Best Director	A Star is Born	Nominated	
Washington D.C. Area Film Critics Association	2018	Best Adapted Screenplay	A Star is Born	Nominated	
Washington D.C. Area Film Critics Association	2023	Best Actor	Maestro	Nominated	
Women Film Critics Circle	2018	Best Screen Couple	A Star is Born	Nominated	
