= Wrekin Hill Entertainment =

American independent film distribution and production company

- Industry: Motion pictures
- Founded: 2010; 16 years ago
- Founder: Chris Ball
- Fate: Dormancy
- Headquarters: Los Angeles, California, United States
- Key people: Rene Cogan; John Crye
- Website: www.wrekinhillentertainment.com

Wrekin Hill Entertainment is an American independent film production and distribution company based in Los Angeles, California. Since their latest film released somewhere around the late 2010s, the company seems to be dormant.

== History ==
In September 2010, it was announced that Chris Ball (who founded Newmarket Films in 1994) would leave the company to start a new distribution company. This comes after Newmarket was acquired by Exclusive Media Group in 2009, though the company would release titles together. Ball also brought two colleagues from Newmarket to the company. Two months later in November, Lionsgate announced that entered an agreement with the company for DVD home entertainment distribution.

== Underhill Films ==
In March 2011, it was announced that Wrekin Hill launched a subsidiary label called Underhill Films (shown as Underhill Entertainmet on releases) and both will benefit from home entertainment distribution output deal with Lionsgate.

== Filmography ==
Release date	Title	Notes
2010	Bending All the Rules	As distributor worldwide along with Lionsgate Home Entertainment
July 31, 2010	Tales of an Ancient Empire	As distributor for DVD release under Underhill Films
September 17, 2010	Locked In	As distributor for DVD release
October 21, 2010	The Last Play at Shea	Co-production
December 29, 2010	The Way Back	As distributor for theatrical release along with Newmarket Films and Image Entertainment for DVD release
2011	Fading of the Cries	As distributor for DVD release under Underhill Films
May 13, 2011	Hesher	As distributor along with Newmarket Films
May 27, 2011	Spork	As distributor under Underhill Films all over North America while eOne distributes the movie on DVD and Gravitas Ventures video on-demand
October 13, 2011	Answer This!	As distributor for theatrical release
October 25, 2011	The People vs. George Lucas	As distributor worldwide
2012	Road to Hell	As distributor for DVD release
January 20, 2012	The Flowers of War	As distributor
March 8, 2012	Dark Tide	As distributor
March 13, 2012	Stuck Between Stations	As distributor
April 6, 2012	Comic-Con Episode IV: A Fan's Hope	As distributor for theatrical release
July 1, 2012	Man From Shaolin	As distributor
August 14, 2012	Girl Walks into a Bar	As distributor for DVD release
September 7, 2012	The Inbetweeners	As distributor
September 25, 2012	The Letter	As distributor
November 2, 2012	Amber Alert	As distributor for theatrical release
January 1, 2013	Breaking at the Edge	As distributor for theatrical release
March 1, 2013	The End of Love	As distributor of theatrical release while Gravitas Ventures distributed it video on-demand
May 21, 2013	Cool Air	As distributor
August 2, 2013	Drift	As distributor for theatrical release
August 6, 2013	Gallowwalkers	As distributor for theatrical release
2013	Cyborg Nemesis: The Dark Rift	As distributor along with Lionsgate
2013	Avenged	As distributor
October 15, 2013	Ingenious	As distributor
December 6, 2013	Night Train to Lisbon	As distributor for theatrical release
2014	Deadly Code	As distributor for theatrical release
July 29, 2014	Legendary	As distributor
September 5, 2014	Green Street Hooligans: Underground	As distributor for theatrical release
December 5, 2014	The Physician	As distributor for theatrical release
December 5, 2014	Yellowbird	As distributor for theatrical release
December 5, 2014	Miss Julie	As distributor for theatrical release
December 12, 2014	Get Santa	As distributor
2016, May 1, 2017, or November 19, 2019	Through My Father's Eyes	Co-production with Lionsgate
