= Nomadic Theatre =

Theater group at Georgetown University

- Formation: 1982
- Type: Collegiate theatre troupe
- Legal status: Active
- Location: Georgetown University
- Region served: Washington, D.C.
- Executive Producer: Alec Hamblet
- Associate Producer: Hailey Ahn
- Website: Nomadic Theatre

Nomadic Theatre is a co-curricular, student-led theatre group at Georgetown University in Washington, D.C. in the United States. Focused on being "technically ambitious and socially engaged," it is dedicated to producing new works that have an aspect of social awareness and using the theatre process to allow students to learn about theatre. The group takes its name from its history of having no permanent theatre to work in.

The group produces three main stage shows a year, usually performed in the Walsh Black Box (no longer in use), the Village C Theatre (now considered the group's "home theatre"), or the Devine Theatre in the Davis Performing Arts Center in the center of Georgetown's campus. Main stage shows are directed, produced, acted, designed almost entirely by students. Often students in large roles such as director, producer, or designer, will have an assistant who they train to be able to perform that role on a future show.

The group also produces "Dead Bunny Productions" (an homage to the original name of the group and formerly known as "Square Pegs"), opportunities for students to get involved in theatre without a large time commitment. These have a much shorter rehearsal process and have minimal technical elements and are often performed in the open air amphitheatre in Red Square or in Bulldog Alley in the Leavey Center.

== History ==
Nomadic was created in 1982 under the name "D&B Productions" by a group of members from the Mask & Bauble Dramatic Society (M&B) who were tired of the Shakespeare and traditional theatre that M&B was known for. Their first show was Harvey, about a man who befriends an imaginary giant rabbit. The group's second production, "The Fantasticks", shifted its early focus to musical theater. The name "Nomadic Theatre" was not used by the group until the spring, 1984 show, "Jacques Brel is Alive and Well and Living in Paris", and was adopted because of the administration's unwillingness to allow the group to reserve facilities for fixed rehearsal locations, thus necessitating cast members for any given show to memorize the "standard progression" of locations where rehearsal space would be sought, and walk from one to the next until the evening's location was found. All of the group's belongings, consisting mostly of costume pieces, a few props, and a complete tool set purchased through the Roy Rogers restaurant points collection game, were kept in a closet illegally occupied by it in the basement of Xavier Hall. During the early years of the group, it produced a series of musical productions (Jacques Brel..., the Jones and Schmidt musical Philemon, A Night in the Ukraine, Sweeney Todd, What's a Nice Country Like You Doing in a State Like This? and Evita) before changing to a non-musical focus.

In 2005 a new building, the Davis Performing Arts Center (DPAC), was constructed. Nomadic and other theatre groups on campus were able to use the advanced scene shop and costume shop for working on their shows, but the building's theatre spaces were to be reserved mainly for faculty directed shows. However, in March 2006, Nomadic Theatre were able to teamed up with the Department of Performing Arts at Georgetown for the first student production ever staged in the Devine Theatre of the building. In 2007, Nomadic became the first group to have a full-scale, student-run show in the Devine, with Translations. Since then Nomadic has occasionally performed in the building.

In the Spring of 2010 members of Nomadic Theatre were instrumental in the organization of Hate-Free Georgetown, a week-long celebration to "promote unity and respect on campus".

Bradley Cooper participated in Nomadic Theatre during his time at Georgetown, notably playing Cassanova in Nomadic's 1995 production of Tennessee Williams' play "Camino Real."

== Productions ==
2026-2027

- The Addams Family (musical) music and lyrics by Andrew Lippa, book by Marshall Brickman and Rick Elice
- Miscast Concert 2027
- Murder on the Orient Express by Agatha Christie, adapted by Ken Ludwig

2025-2026

- Heathers: The Musical book, music, and lyrics by Laurence O'Keefe (composer) and Kevin Murphy (screenwriter)
- Miscast Concert 2026
- A Streetcar Named Desire by Tennessee Williams (collaboration with GU's Black Theatre Ensemble)

2024-2025

- Everybody's Talking About Jamie book and lyrics by Tom MacRae, music by Dan Gillespie
- Sells, from an idea by Jonathan Butterell (co-production with GU's Black Theatre Ensemble)
- Miscast Concert 2025
- Ghosts (play) by Henrik Ibsen, adapted by CC Mesa '26

2023-2024

- Betrayal by Harold Pinter
- Miscast Concert 2024
- Pippin music and lyrics by Stephen Schwartz and book by Roger O. Hirson (collaboration with Mask and Bauble Dramatic Society)

2022-2023

- RENT book, music, and lyrics by Jonathan Larson
- Miscast Concert 2023
- Last Summer at Bluefish Cove by Jane Chambers

2021-2022

- Cabaret (musical) by Joe Masteroff (collaboration with the Department of Performing Arts)
- Sweat (play) by Lynn Nottage (collaboration with GU's Black Theatre Ensemble)

2020-2021

- Love and Information by Caryl Churchill
- Dear Elizabeth by Sarah Ruhl

2019-2020

- Firebringer book by Matt Lang, Nick Lang, and Brian Holden with music and lyrics by Meredith Stepien and Mark Swiderski
- The Wolves by Sarah DeLappe
- John by Annie Baker

2018-2019

- The Language Archive by Julia Cho
- Seph by Tori Keenan-Zelt
- Quake by Melanie Marnich

2017-2018

- Exit, Pursued by a Bear by Lauren Gunderson
- Mr. Burns, a post-electric play by Anne Washburn (collaboration with Mask and Bauble Dramatic Society)
- She Kills Monsters by Qui Nguyen

2016-2017

- Fugue by Lee Thuna
- The Phantom Toll Booth by Norton Juster & Susan Nanus
- The Last Days of Judas Iscariot by Stephen Adly Guirgis

2015-2016

- afterlife: a ghost story by Steve Yockey
- The Metal Children by Adam Rapp
- Happy by Robert Caisley

2014-2015

- boom by Peter Sinn Nachtreib
- Sick by Zayd Dohrn
- Killer Joe by Tracy Letts (collaboration with the Mask & Bauble Dramatic Society)

2013-2014

- Rosencrantz & Guildenstern are Dead by Tom Stoppard
- A Mouthful of Birds by Caryl Churchill (collaboration with the Department of Performing Arts)
- pool (no water) by Mark Ravenhill

2012-2013

- Civil War Christmas by Paula Vogel (collaboration with the Department of Performing Arts)
- The Bald Soprano by Eugène Ionesco
- Polk Street by T. Chase Meacham (collaboration with the Mask & Bauble Dramatic Society)

2011-2012

- The Deep Blue Sea by Terence Rattigan (collaboration with the Mask & Bauble Dramatic Society)
- Flu Season by Will Eno

2010-2011

- Gross Indecency: The Three Trials of Oscar Wilde by Moisés Kaufman
- The House of Yes by Wendy MacLeod
- References to Salvador Dalí Make Me Hot by José Rivera

2009-2010

- Getting Out by Marsha Norman
- The Real Thing by Tom Stoppard (collaboration with the Mask & Bauble Dramatic Society)
- The Pain and the Itch by Bruce Norris

2008-2009

- The Clean House by Sarah Ruhl
- The Pillowman by Martin McDonagh

2007-2008

- The Exonerated by Jessica Blank and Erik Jensen
- House of Blue Leaves by John Guare
- Salt Water Moon by David French

2006-2007

- Zoo Story by Edward Albee
- Translations by Brian Friel

2005-2006

- Machinal by Sophie Treadwell
- The Trestle at Pope Lick Creek by Naomi Wallace

2004-2005

- Summertime by Charles Mee
- Two Rooms by Lee Blessing
- Pygmalion by George Bernard Shaw

1986-1987

- What's a Nice Country Like You Doing In A State Like This?
- Evita

1985-1986

- A Night in the Ukraine
- Sweeney Todd

1984-1985

- Sister Mary Ignatius Explains It All For You
- Philemon by Jones & Schmidt

1983-1984

- A Night of One-Acts (including The American Dream by Edward Albee)
- Jacques Brel is Alive and Well and Living in Paris

1982-1983

- Harvey
- The Fantasticks by Tom Jones and Harvey Schmidt
