= David Gail =

American actor (1965–2024)

- Born: February 27, 1965; Tampa, Florida, U.S.
- Died: January 16, 2024 (aged 58)
- Occupation: Actor
- Years active: 1990–2019

David Gilbert Gail (February 27, 1965 – January 16, 2024) was an American actor.

== Biography ==
Gail starred as Danny Burke in the 1992 prime time soap opera The Round Table before portraying the recurring role of Stuart Carson, Brenda Walsh's (Shannen Doherty) fiancé on Beverly Hills, 90210 from 1993 to 1994. He also played the role of Palm Springs hotel worker "Tom" on a Season 1 episode 15 Weekend à Palm Springs of Beverly Hills 90210 "A Fling in Palm Springs." He next starred as Eddie Bartlett in Robin's Hoods (1994–1995) and as Dean Collins in Savannah (1996–1997). From 1999 to 2000, Gail played Dr. Joe Scanlon on Port Charles.

Gail died on January 16, 2024, at the age of 58. He suffered a cardiac arrest and was placed on life support for several days prior to his death. His cause of death was later attributed to heart attack and anoxic-ischemic encephalopathy due to multiple drug intoxication involving fentanyl, cocaine, alcohol, amphetamines. Shannen Doherty posted a photo of their two Beverly Hills 90210 characters dancing on her Instagram. Six months later, on July 13, 2024, Doherty herself died from Stage 4 breast cancer.

== Selected filmography ==
Television
Year	Title	Role	Notes
1990	Growing Pains	Norman	Episode: "The World According to Chrissy"
1991	Doogie Howser, M.D.	Ian Samuels	Episode: "Lonesome Doog"
1991	Beverly Hills, 90210	Tom	Episode: "A Fling in Palm Springs"
1992	The Round Table	Danny Burke	Main role
1993	Murder, She Wrote	Monroe Shepard	Episode: "Love's Deadly Desire"
1993	Matlock	Mike Rydell	2 episodes
1993–1994	Beverly Hills, 90210	Stuart Carson	Recurring
1994–1995	Robin's Hoods	Eddie Bartlett	Main role
1996–1997	Savannah	Dean Collins	Main role
1999–2000	Port Charles	Dr. Joe Scanlon	Main role
2002	ER	Sgt. Andrews	1 episode
2003	JAG	Lt. Cmdr. John Bartell	1 episode

Film
Year	Title	Role	Notes
1997	Two Came Back	Matt	TV film
1998	Some Girl	Mitchell	
2002	Bending All the Rules	Martin	
2004	Perfect Opposites	Rex	
2004	The Hollywood Mom's Mystery	Justin Caffrey	TV film
