= The Round Table (TV series) =

- Genre: Soap opera
- Directed by: Jeff Bleckner
- Starring: Stacy Haiduk; David Gail; Pepper Sweeney; Roxann Biggs
- Opening theme: "Young Americans" sung by David Bowie
- Country of origin: United States
- Original language: English
- No. of seasons: 1
- No. of episodes: 7 (2 unaired)

Production
- Producers: Gary A. Randall; Aaron Spelling; Bryce Zabel
- Running time: 60 minutes
- Production company: Spelling Television

Original release
- Network: NBC
- Release: September 18 – October 16, 1992

The Round Table is an American prime-time television soap opera that aired on NBC on Friday nights from September 18 to October 16, 1992.

== Series ==
The series is set in Washington, D.C., and focuses on the lives of a group of professionals in their mid-twenties, who frequent a bar called The Round Table. (In this way, it was reminiscent of the 1985 "brat pack" film St. Elmo's Fire.) It aired at 9pm Eastern on Friday nights, and although the competition was not particularly strong (mostly Dinosaurs on ABC and the final season of Designing Women on CBS, neither of which was in the Top 25 that year), The Round Table was cancelled after just five episodes, plus two that were produced but did not air. Many of the show's stars would later surface in other projects.

The series was produced by Aaron Spelling, who had another series that premiered that fall: Melrose Place, which was a hit and ran seven seasons.

The David Bowie tune "Young Americans" served as The Round Table's theme song.

== Cast ==
- David Ackroyd as Senator Jack Reed
- Roxann Biggs as Jennifer Clemente
- Thomas Breznahan as Mitchell Clark
- David Gail as Danny Burke
- Stacy Haiduk as Rhea McPherson
- Erik King as Wade Carter
- Pepper Sweeney as Deveraux Jones
- Jessica Walter as Anne McPherson
- Alexandra Wilson as Kaitlin Cavanaugh (episode 3+)

== Episodes ==
No.	Title	Directed by	Written by	Original release date
1	"Yesterday We Were Playing Football"	Unknown	Unknown	September 18, 1992
2	"Yesterday We Were Playing Football"	Unknown	Unknown	September 18, 1992
3	"Were You Scared?"	Unknown	Unknown	September 25, 1992
4	"The Mirror Didn't Cover It All"	Unknown	Unknown	October 2, 1992
5	"I Mean, What About Me?"	Unknown	Unknown	October 9, 1992
6	"Don't Worry, Mom, Everything's Under Control"	Unknown	Unknown	October 16, 1992
7	"Do Me!"	TBD	TBD	N/A
8	"Just Like I Remembered"	TBD	TBD	N/A
