= Bending All the Rules =

- Film poster
- Directed by: Morgan Klein; Peter Knight
- Written by: Morgan Klein; Peter Knight
- Starring: Bradley Cooper; Colleen Porch; David Gail; Morgan Klein; Shauna Vatovec; Ashlee Payne; Jennifer Shumaker; Alana de la Garza; J.C. Loader; Sam Beam; Wade Boggs
- Cinematography: Rob Allen
- Edited by: Jose Alvarez
- Music by: Martin Klein; Molly Knight Forde
- Production companies: Red Lizard Films; Minaret Films
- Distributed by: Lionsgate; Wrekin Hill Entertainment
- Release dates: September 27, 2002 (Tampa); June 21, 2011 (DVD)
- Running time: 93 minutes
- Country: United States
- Language: English

Bending All the Rules is a 2002 American romance film written and directed by Morgan Klein and Peter Knight, and starring Bradley Cooper.

== Plot ==
An ambitious woman with an odd upbringing struggles to find herself amidst juggling two guys she's dating. Even though both guys know about each other and are complete opposites, jealousy begins to boil over as convivial antics break out between the two. Tough decisions will be made when growing up the hard way.

== Cast ==
- Bradley Cooper as Jeff
- Colleen Porch as Kenna
- David Gail as Martin
- Morgan Klein as DJ Sweaty
- Shauna Vatovec as Young Kenna
- Ashlee Payne as Lauri
- Jennifer Shumaker as Aunt Charlee
- Alana de la Garza as the Woman ordering shots
- J.C. Loader as Gina
- Sam Beam cameo
- Wade Boggs cameo

== Production ==
It was filmed in Florida.

== Release ==
The film released in Tampa on September 27, 2002 and released on DVD by Lionsgate on June 21, 2011.
