= I Want to Marry Ryan Banks =

2004 television film

- Written by: Chad Hodge
- Directed by: Sheldon Larry
- Starring: Jason Priestley; Bradley Cooper; Emma Caulfield; Mark L. Walberg; Paige Jones; Lauren Lee Smith
- Music by: Phil Marshall
- Country of origin: United States
- Original language: English

Production
- Producers: Ted Bauman; Howard Braunstein; Joel S. Rice; Michael Jaffe
- Cinematography: Tony Westman
- Editor: Rob Seidenglanz
- Running time: 95 minutes

Original release
- Network: ABC Family
- Release: January 18, 2004

I Want to Marry Ryan Banks (also known as Reality of Love) is a 2004 American television film starring Jason Priestley, Bradley Cooper and Emma Caulfield. The film premiered on ABC Family on January 18, 2004.

== Plot ==
Ryan Banks is a struggling movie star. His best friend and agent, Todd Doherty, creates a TV show called I Want to Marry Ryan Banks in hopes of saving Banks's faltering career. The show works much like The Bachelor TV show, with fifteen beautiful women competing for Banks's love and affection.

Charlie Norton becomes a contestant when her sister and brother-in-law submit an audition tape for her. Like all the other girls, Norton is picked in order to help boost Banks's image. She is then contacted at her sister's Boston bar by Banks himself and decides to participate on the show.

Once in the house, Norton becomes fast friends with her roommate Lauren, an aspiring actress who is only using the show to get exposure. She also discovers how "reality" TV shows work, with multiple takes and editing.

As Norton thinks she is falling for Banks, Doherty is feeding him lines. When Norton discovers that the man she loves is really Doherty, she tries to quit the show, only to find out that it would breach her contract. As "America's choice", Norton and Lauren become the two finalists, despite Norton trying to sabotage her own chances by changing her sweet and easy-going behavior while on a trip with Banks.

With Banks's help, Doherty manages to get Norton back, and they are married a year later.

== Cast ==
- Jason Priestley as Ryan Banks
- Bradley Cooper as Todd Doherty
- Emma Caulfield as Charlie Norton
- Mark L. Walberg as Stan
- Lauren Lee Smith as Lauren, Charlie's roommate
- Paige Bluejacket as Jessica

== Home media ==
The movie was released on DVD in 2012 under the title Reality of Love.
