= Bradley Cooper =

American actor and filmmaker (born 1975)

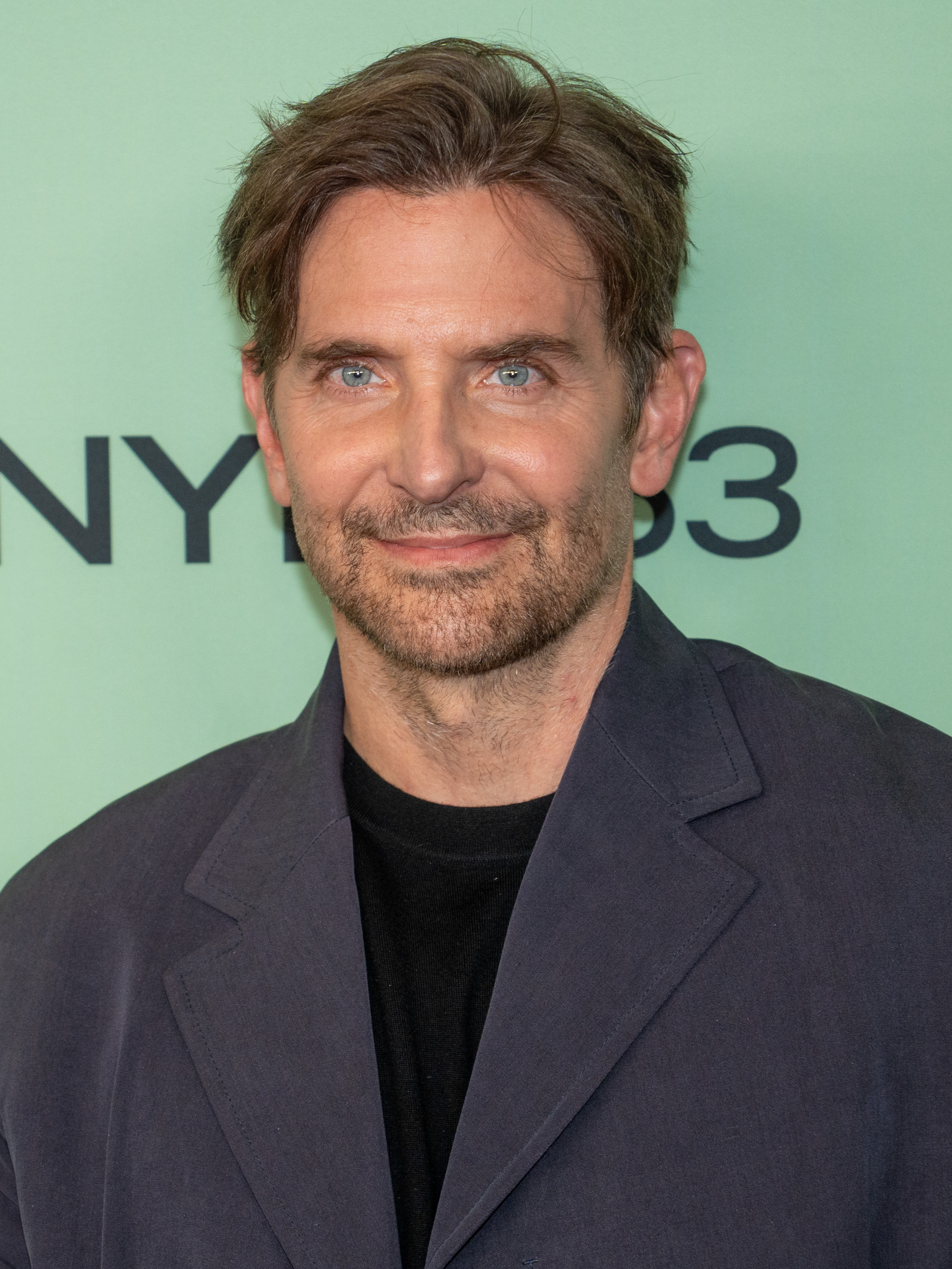
- Cooper at the 2025 New York Film Festival
- Born: Bradley Charles Cooper; January 5, 1975 (age 51); Abington Township, Pennsylvania, U.S.
- Education: Georgetown University (BA); The New School (MFA)
- Occupations: Actor; film director; producer; screenwriter
- Years active: 1999–present
- Works: Full list
- Spouse: Jennifer Esposito (m. 2006; div. 2007)
- Partner(s): Irina Shayk (2015–2019)
- Children: 1
- Awards: Full list
- Cooper's voice from the BBC programme The Film Programme, November 5, 2015

Bradley Charles Cooper (born January 5, 1975) is an American actor and filmmaker. He is the recipient of various accolades, including a British Academy Film Award and three Grammy Awards. In addition, he has been nominated for twelve Academy Awards, six Golden Globe Awards, and a Tony Award. Cooper appeared on the Forbes Celebrity 100 list three times and on Time's list of the 100 most influential people in the world in 2015. His films have grossed $13 billion worldwide, and he has been placed in annual rankings of the world's highest-paid actors four times.

Cooper began his television and film career in 1999 with a guest role in the television series Sex and the City. In 2000, he enrolled in the Master of Fine Arts (MFA) program at the Actors Studio. Shortly after, he made his film debut with a role in the comedy Wet Hot American Summer (2001), followed by roles as Will Tippin in the television series Alias (2001–2006) and a supporting part in the comedy film Wedding Crashers (2005). Cooper's breakthrough came with the comedy The Hangover (2009), which also spawned sequels in 2011 and 2013. His career progressed with starring roles in Limitless (2011) and The Place Beyond the Pines (2012).

Cooper earned Academy Award nominations for his work in the romantic comedy Silver Linings Playbook (2012), the crime film American Hustle (2013), the war biopic American Sniper (2014), the musical romance A Star Is Born (2018), and the biographical drama Maestro (2023). For A Star Is Born, which he also produced, wrote, and directed, he won a BAFTA Award and two Grammys for his contributions to the film's U.S. Billboard 200 number one soundtrack and its Billboard Hot 100 chart-topping single "Shallow". He gained further recognition for voicing Rocket across six films in the Marvel Cinematic Universe, beginning with Guardians of the Galaxy (2014). He has since produced the thrillers Joker (2019) and Nightmare Alley (2021).

On stage, Cooper portrayed Joseph Merrick in a Broadway revival of The Elephant Man. Cooper was named People magazine's Sexiest Man Alive in 2011. He supports several charities that help fight cancer. Cooper was briefly married to actress Jennifer Esposito and has a daughter from his relationship with model Irina Shayk.

== Early life ==
Bradley Charles Cooper was born on January 5, 1975, in Abington Township, Pennsylvania, near Philadelphia, and grew up in the nearby communities of Jenkintown and Rydal. His mother, Gloria (née Campano), worked at KYW-TV, which was then Philadelphia's NBC affiliate. His father, Charles Cooper, worked as a stockbroker for Merrill Lynch. Cooper's father was of Irish descent, while his mother is of Italian ancestry (from Abruzzo and Naples). He was raised Catholic. He has an older sister, Holly. He had cholesteatoma in his ear soon after his birth and punctured his eardrum when he started diving at an early age.

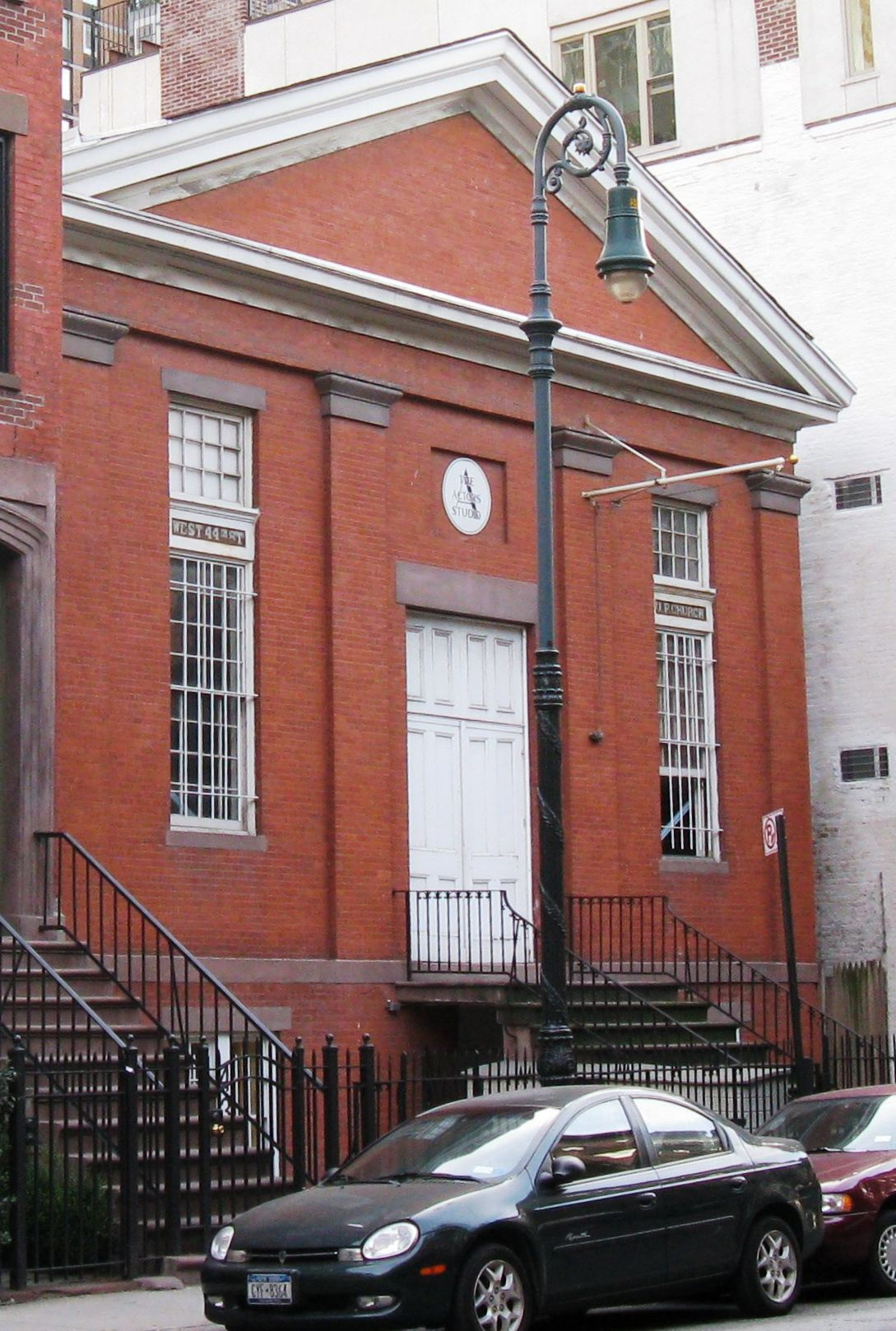
The Actors Studio, where Cooper trained to be an actor

Describing himself as a child, Cooper has said: "I never lived the life of 'Oh, you're so good-looking'. People thought I was a girl when I was little, because I looked like a girl – maybe because my mother would keep my hair really long." He excelled at basketball and enjoyed cooking: "I used to have buddies come over after kindergarten and I'd cook them food. I prided myself in taking whatever was in the fridge and turning it into lasagna." He initially wanted to attend Valley Forge Military Academy and move to Japan to become a ninja. At an early age, his father introduced him to films like The Elephant Man, which inspired him to be an actor. Coming from a family of non-actors, Cooper says his parents initially wanted him to pursue a career in finance and were against acting, but they eventually changed their perceptions when they saw Cooper play the part of Joseph Merrick in an excerpt from the play The Elephant Man.

While attending Germantown Academy, he worked at the Philadelphia Daily News. He says that in school, he was neither "the smartest person" nor "the coolest kid" and "really didn't have anything going on!" After graduating from high school in 1993, Cooper attended Villanova University for one year before transferring to Georgetown University, where he majored in English and minored in French. Cooper graduated in 1997 with a Bachelor of Arts with honors. He was a member of the Georgetown Hoyas rowing team and acted with Nomadic Theatre. While at Georgetown, Cooper became fluent in French and spent six months as an exchange student in Aix-en-Provence, France. In his television debut, Sex and the City in 1999, he made a brief appearance opposite Sarah Jessica Parker. Cooper later served as a presenter on the tourism series Globe Trekker (2000), which took him to such places as Peru and Croatia, and had a recurring role in the short-lived series The Street.

Cooper had been interested in a career in diplomacy when he auditioned for the master class graduate degree at the Actors Studio and was selected by James Lipton. In 2000, he received an MFA in acting from the Actors Studio Drama School at The New School in New York City. There, he trained with the coach Elizabeth Kemp of whom he says: "I was never able to relax in my life before her." She advised him on many of his films. While studying in New York City, Cooper worked as a doorman at the Morgans Hotel, and briefly interacted with Robert de Niro and Sean Penn in question-and-answer master class sessions, which were later featured episodes of Inside the Actors Studio.

== Career ==
=== 2001–2008: Early roles ===
Cooper missed his MFA graduation ceremony to film Wet Hot American Summer (2001), an ensemble comedy that marked his cinematic debut. Taking place at a fictional summer camp in 1981, the film had him play Ben, a counselor and the love interest of Michael Ian Black's character. Although the film was critically and commercially unsuccessful, it has since developed a cult following. Cooper reprised the role in the film's prequel Wet Hot American Summer: First Day of Camp (2015), an eight-episode Netflix series.

In the television series Alias (2001–2006), Cooper achieved some success with the role of Will Tippin, a local reporter for a newspaper and the best friend of Jennifer Garner's character, Sydney Bristow. Garner was one of the first people he met in Los Angeles and was, in Cooper's words, "very maternal ... She wanted to take care of me, make sure I was okay all the time." A writer for Complex Networks called his character "arguably the heart of Season 1". As his screen time began to decrease, Cooper grew frustrated. Although he would work only three days, he requested creator J. J. Abrams to write his character off the show.

Shortly after his conversation with Abrams, Cooper tore his Achilles tendon while playing basketball. During his recovery, he considered quitting acting permanently, though in 2004, he was cast in Wedding Crashers (2005). During this period, he acted in the 2002 psychological thriller Changing Lanes. The scenes in which he appeared were edited out of the final cut of the film but are featured on the film's DVD and Blu-ray releases. Other roles included in Bending All the Rules (2002), the short-lived TV series Miss Match (2003), the television film I Want to Marry Ryan Banks (2004), and the WB series Jack & Bobby (2004–2005).

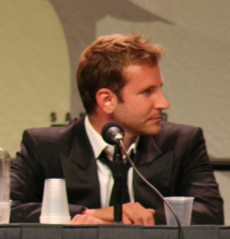
Cooper at an event for The Midnight Meat Train in 2007

Cooper's career prospects improved with a more prominent role in David Dobkin's comedy Wedding Crashers alongside Owen Wilson, Vince Vaughn, and Rachel McAdams. In the film, he played Sack Lodge, the competitive, arrogant, and aggressive boyfriend of Claire (McAdams), a role he described as "kind of a sociopath". Cooper believed the antagonistic character changed people's perception of him, as he had previously played the "nice guy". With a production budget of $40 million, the film grossed over $285 million worldwide. In September 2005, Fox debuted the sitcom Kitchen Confidential, based on a memoir by chef Anthony Bourdain, with Cooper in the leading role. Despite positive reviews for the series, the show was canceled after only four episodes due to low ratings.

In March 2006, Cooper starred as Pip/Theo in Three Days of Rain on Broadway with Julia Roberts and Paul Rudd. This was followed by minor roles in the romantic comedy Failure to Launch (2006) and the satirical comedy The Comebacks (2007). Cooper next appeared in the fifth season of Nip/Tuck (2007) as Aidan Stone, a television star on the fictional show Hearts 'N Scalpels. In 2008, he played the lead in Older than America and appeared in a production of Theresa Rebeck's play The Understudy at the Williamstown Theatre Festival alongside Kristen Johnston. Between his small roles of best friend to the main character in the 2008 comedies Yes Man and The Rocker, Cooper landed the lead role in the Ryuhei Kitamura-directed horror film The Midnight Meat Train (2008), based on Clive Barker's 1984 short story of the same name. Playing the dark character of a freelance photographer who tries to track down a serial killer was a departure from Cooper's previous comedic roles and an experience he found enjoyable. The film received positive reviews from critics, though it earned little at the box office.

=== 2009–2012: Breakthrough ===
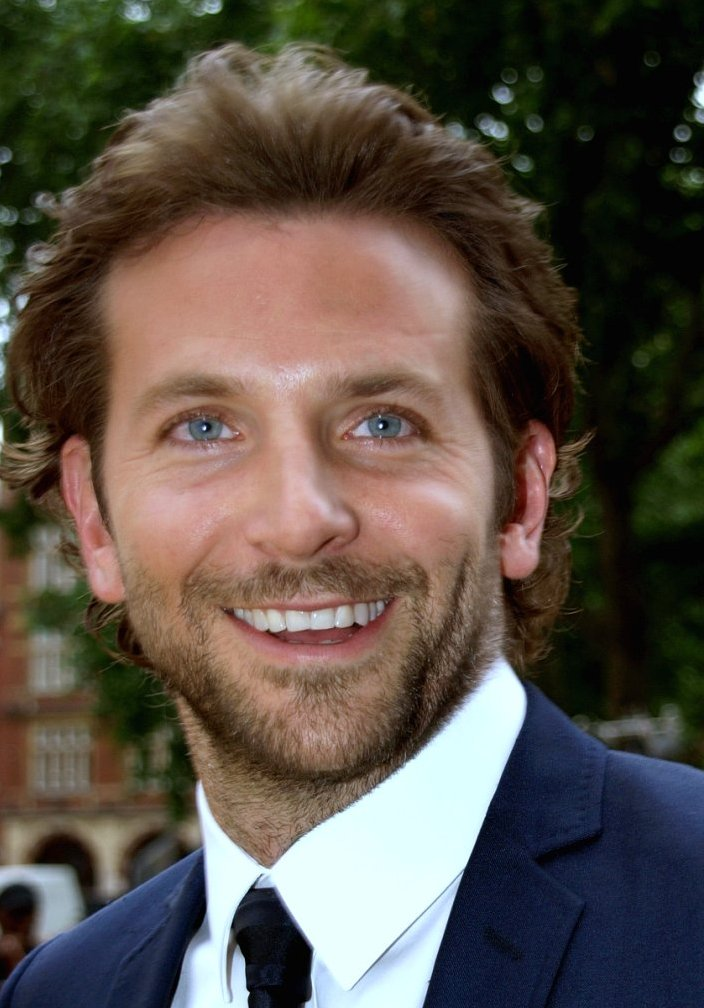
Cooper at the premiere of The Hangover in 2009

In February 2009, Cooper hosted Saturday Night Live with musical guest TV on the Radio, portraying actor Christian Bale in one sketch, and appeared in a supporting role in the film He's Just Not That Into You. Cooper's breakthrough role came in Todd Phillips' comedy The Hangover (2009). He played Phil Wenneck, one of three friends (Ed Helms and Zach Galifianakis) to wake up from a bachelor party in Las Vegas with no memory of the previous night. The Hangover was a commercial success and finished as among the highest-grossing R-rated films in the United States. A. O. Scott of The New York Times wrote, "Mr. Cooper ... offers the most interesting variation on an old standard, playing his aggressive, cocky frat boy with a snarl of rage that masks an anxiety as hard to account for as it is to miss." For his performance, Cooper received an award at the 13th Hollywood Film Festival and his first nomination for the MTV Movie Awards (Best Comedic Performance). The Daily Telegraph opined that the film's success turned Cooper into "a bona fide leading man". Nevertheless, Cooper stated in a 2011 interview with Shave: "It's the same. I mean, look, more doors have been opened for sure, but it's not like I sit back with a cigar on Monday morning and go through the scripts that have been offered."

Also in 2009, Cooper was featured in the psychological horror Case 39, a delayed production that had been filmed in 2006. He paired with Sandra Bullock in the comedy All About Steve, a film that was panned by critics, failed to attract a wide audience, and earned them a Golden Raspberry Award for Worst Screen Combo. Following a role in one of eleven segments of the anthology film New York, I Love You (2009), Cooper appeared in the ensemble romantic comedy Valentine's Day (2010), directed by Garry Marshall and co-starring with Julia Roberts. The film was a commercial success, grossing over $215 million worldwide. He then starred in the comedy Brother's Justice and as the fictional character Templeton "Faceman" Peck in the feature film version of The A-Team alongside Liam Neeson, Quinton Jackson, and Sharlto Copley. To prepare for the role, he abstained from consuming sugar, salt, and flour, and underwent grueling workouts. The film released to negative reviews and poor box office returns. Tim Robey of The Daily Telegraph wrote: "Cooper confirms his credentials as perhaps the most smugly narcissistic performer," while Nev Pierce of Empire credited both Cooper and Copley for "acing swagger and insanity respectively, who best both capture and yet re-forge their iconic characters". Cooper appeared as guest host of WWE Raw in June 2010.

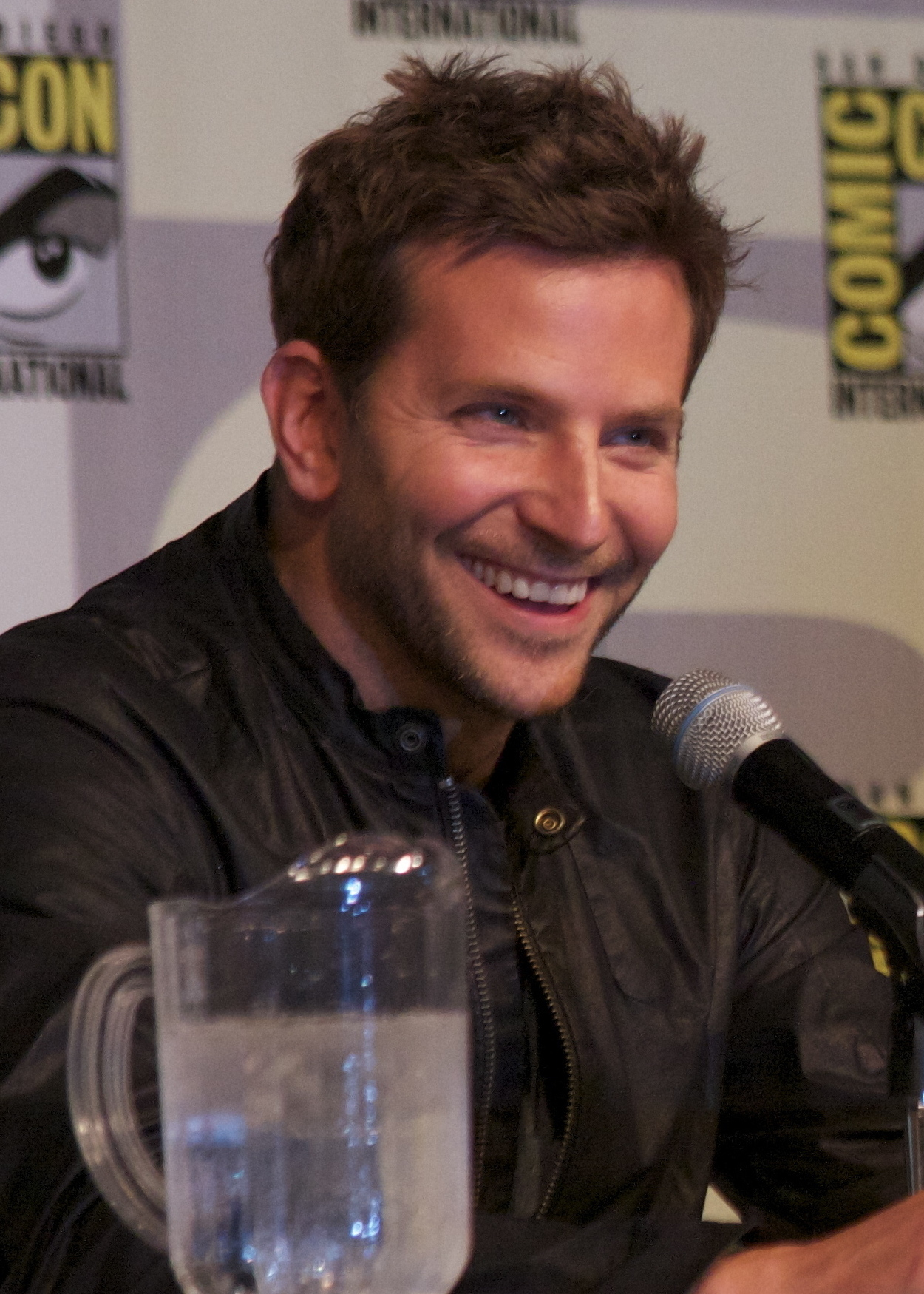
Cooper at the 2011 San Diego Comic-Con

In 2011, Cooper starred in the techno-thriller Limitless, based on the 2001 novel The Dark Fields by Alan Glynn. In the Neil Burger-directed film, he played a struggling writer who is introduced to a nootropic drug that gives him the ability to fully utilize his brain and vastly improve his lifestyle. The box office website Box Office Mojo was apprehensive of the film's financial prospects, but it emerged as a commercial success with a worldwide gross of $161 million. A writer for Variety said of Cooper's performance that he "makes further strides toward major stardom, spelling excellent early spring returns and socko vid play". Greater commercial success followed with the comedy sequel The Hangover Part II (2011), which earned over $580 million worldwide. Reviews for the film were generally negative, but Mary Pols of Time magazine complimented Cooper, writing that the actor "gives a knowing performance: he's both the peacock and the parody of one. He's blessed with good looks and fantastic timing, the kind that makes every line funnier, even the small asides." At the 38th People's Choice Awards, he was nominated for Favorite Comedic Movie Actor.

The year 2012 saw Cooper star in four films: The Words, Hit and Run, The Place Beyond the Pines, and Silver Linings Playbook. The mystery drama The Words failed commercially, as did the action comedy Hit and Run. In Derek Cianfrance's critically acclaimed crime drama The Place Beyond the Pines, Cooper played a rookie police officer, a role Cianfrance specifically wrote for him. The director drove five hours to Montreal to meet with Cooper to convince him to take on the role. Cianfrance described Cooper's character as someone "paraded as a hero ... But inside him corruption is going on, conflict is raging inside, guilt and shame are buried." A reviewer for The Independent credited Cooper for "excelling as an archetype, the principled man who is personally rather dislikeable", adding, "I never imagined this actor capable of such layered character work." Despite positive reviews, the film had moderate box office returns.

Cooper starred with Robert De Niro and Jennifer Lawrence in David O. Russell's romantic comedy-drama Silver Linings Playbook, an adaptation of Matthew Quick's serio-comic novel of the same name. He was cast as a divorced man with bipolar disorder, a former teacher who finds companionship in a young, depressed widow (Lawrence). Cooper was initially skeptical about playing the part which he thought was out of his depth, but he later accepted the role inspired by Russell's confidence in him. The director was impressed with his performance in Wedding Crashers, citing his "good bad-guy energy" and unpredictability as justification for casting; he also thought Cooper would be able to demonstrate emotion and vulnerability onscreen. To prepare, Cooper took dance training with choreographer Mandy Moore, who describes Cooper as having "some real natural dancing ability". The film was a box-office success, earning $236.4 million on a production budget of $21 million. Peter Travers of Rolling Stone wrote that Cooper "seizes the juiciest role of his career and meets every comic and dramatic challenge. There's an ache in his funny, touching and vital performance that resonates." For his performance, he earned an MTV Movie Award for Best Performance, and nominations for an Academy Award, Golden Globe Award, and Screen Actors Guild Award for Best Actor.

=== 2013–2017: Established actor ===
In 2013, Cooper reprised his role as Phil Wenneck in the third and final installment of The Hangover trilogy, The Hangover Part III, which was poorly reviewed by critics. The critic for The Independent argued that Cooper was "reduced to mugging for the camera, offering reaction shots to nothing". Nevertheless, like its preceding entries, the film was a commercial success, grossing $362 million worldwide, and remains one of Cooper's highest-grossing releases. Later that year, he took on the supporting role of an unhinged FBI agent in David O. Russell's crime comedy-drama American Hustle. Inspired by the FBI's Abscam sting operation, the film is set against the backdrop of political corruption in 1970s New Jersey. It also starred Christian Bale, Amy Adams, Jeremy Renner and Jennifer Lawrence. American Hustle was a critical and commercial success with global revenues of $251.1 million. Kim Newman of Empire wrote: "Cooper is stuck with the least rewarding role, but keeps finding brilliant little bits of business to hold the attention," and praised "[Cooper's] spot impersonations of his overly cautious (but smart) boss". Cooper was nominated for an Academy Award, BAFTA Award, Critics' Choice Movie Award, and a Golden Globe Award for Best Supporting Actor but did not win any.

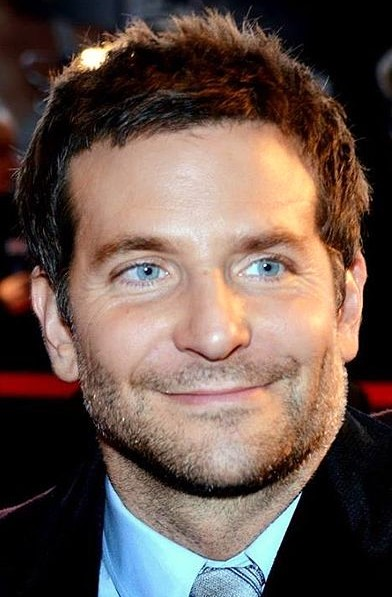
Cooper at the French premiere of American Hustle in 2014

Cooper reunited with Lawrence in the Susanne Bier-directed drama Serena, an adaptation of Ron Rash's period novel. The pair starred as a married couple who become involved in criminal activities after realizing that they cannot bear children. The picture was filmed in 2012 but was released in 2014 to negative reviews and poor box office returns. The Canberra Times' Jake Wilson stated: "Cooper once again proves his value as a leading man who approaches his roles like a character actor." In 2014, Cooper provided the voice of Rocket Raccoon in the Marvel Studios film Guardians of the Galaxy. He returned to Broadway for the 2014 run of The Elephant Man as the severely deformed Joseph Merrick. Michael Coveney of Whatsonstage.com wrote of his performance: "Cooper avoids every trap of 'disability' acting by suffusing this outer appearance with soul and passion. It's a wonderful, and very moving, display." He garnered a nomination for the Tony Award for Best Actor in a Play.

Also in 2014, Cooper co-produced and starred as United States Navy SEAL sniper Chris Kyle in American Sniper, a biographical war drama directed by Clint Eastwood. The film tells the story of Kyle, who became the deadliest marksman in US military history, and is loosely based on the eponymous memoir. To appear to be as large as Kyle, Cooper underwent extensive training and followed a rigorous diet, gaining 40 pounds (18 kg) of muscle. Cooper's preparation also included lessons with a vocal coach and studying footage of Kyle. To learn how to use a rifle, the actor trained with US Navy SEAL veteran Kevin Lacz, who served with Kyle. The film, and Cooper's performance, received generally positive reviews. The critic for Variety wrote, "an excellent performance from a bulked-up Bradley Cooper, this harrowing and intimate character study offers fairly blunt insights into the physical and psychological toll exacted on the front lines." Similar sentiments were echoed by USA Today's Claudia Puig who asserted, "It's clearly Cooper's show. Substantially bulked up and affecting a believable Texas drawl, Cooper embodies Kyle's confidence, intensity and vulnerability." American Sniper earned $547 million worldwide to become Cooper's highest-grossing live-action film and the third highest-grossing R-rated film of all time. Cooper won an MTV Movie Award for Best Male Performance and was nominated for an Academy Award for Best Actor; the film was nominated for Best Picture. With these nominations, Cooper became the tenth actor in history to receive an Academy Award nomination for acting in three consecutive years. (Note: Other actors who have received nominations in three consecutive years include: Spencer Tracy, Gary Cooper, Gregory Peck, Richard Burton, Jack Nicholson, William Hurt, and Russell Crowe, while Marlon Brando and Al Pacino received nominations in four consecutive years. All but Burton won at least once.)

None of Cooper's films released in 2015 – Aloha, Burnt, or Joy – fared well at the box office. He starred in Cameron Crowe's Aloha with Emma Stone and Rachel McAdams. The project was the subject of controversy after the Media Action Network for Asian-Americans accused the filmmakers of whitewashing the cast. Despite the backlash, he was nominated for Choice Movie Actor – Comedy at the 2015 Teen Choice Awards. In John Wells' drama Burnt, Cooper played a chef who decides to regain his former glory after drug abuse takes a toll on his career. While the film was criticized for its "overdone clichés", Jon Frosch of The Hollywood Reporter said: "[Cooper] gives a fully engaged performance that almost makes us want to forgive the movie's laziness. Almost." His supporting role in the biopic Joy reunited him with David O. Russell and Lawrence. In 2016, he had a voice cameo in the thriller 10 Cloverfield Lane and played a supporting part in War Dogs, co-produced under his and Todd Phillips's production company Joint Effort. In 2017, Cooper again voiced Rocket Raccoon in Guardians of the Galaxy Vol. 2.

=== 2018–present: Expansion to filmmaking ===
After reprising the role of Rocket Raccoon in Avengers: Infinity War (2018), Cooper directed his first film, A Star Is Born, a remake of the 1937 film of the same name. Cooper starred in the film as an established singer, Jackson Maine, whose romance with a woman named Ally (played by Lady Gaga) becomes strained after her career begins to overshadow his. Having long aspired to direct a film, Cooper was keen on making a love story. People had warned him against directing a third remake, and he feared the film would end his directing career if it failed. The film premiered at the 75th Venice International Film Festival in August 2018 and was released worldwide in October to critical acclaim. On Cooper's direction, Owen Gleiberman of Variety wrote that "to say that [Cooper] does a good job would be to understate his accomplishment" and that he "gets right onto the high wire". Brian Tallerico, writing for RogerEbert.com, said Cooper "does some of the best work of his career" and gives "an excellent performance", praising his singing abilities and chemistry with Gaga. The film earned over $436 million at the box office against a production budget of $36 million.

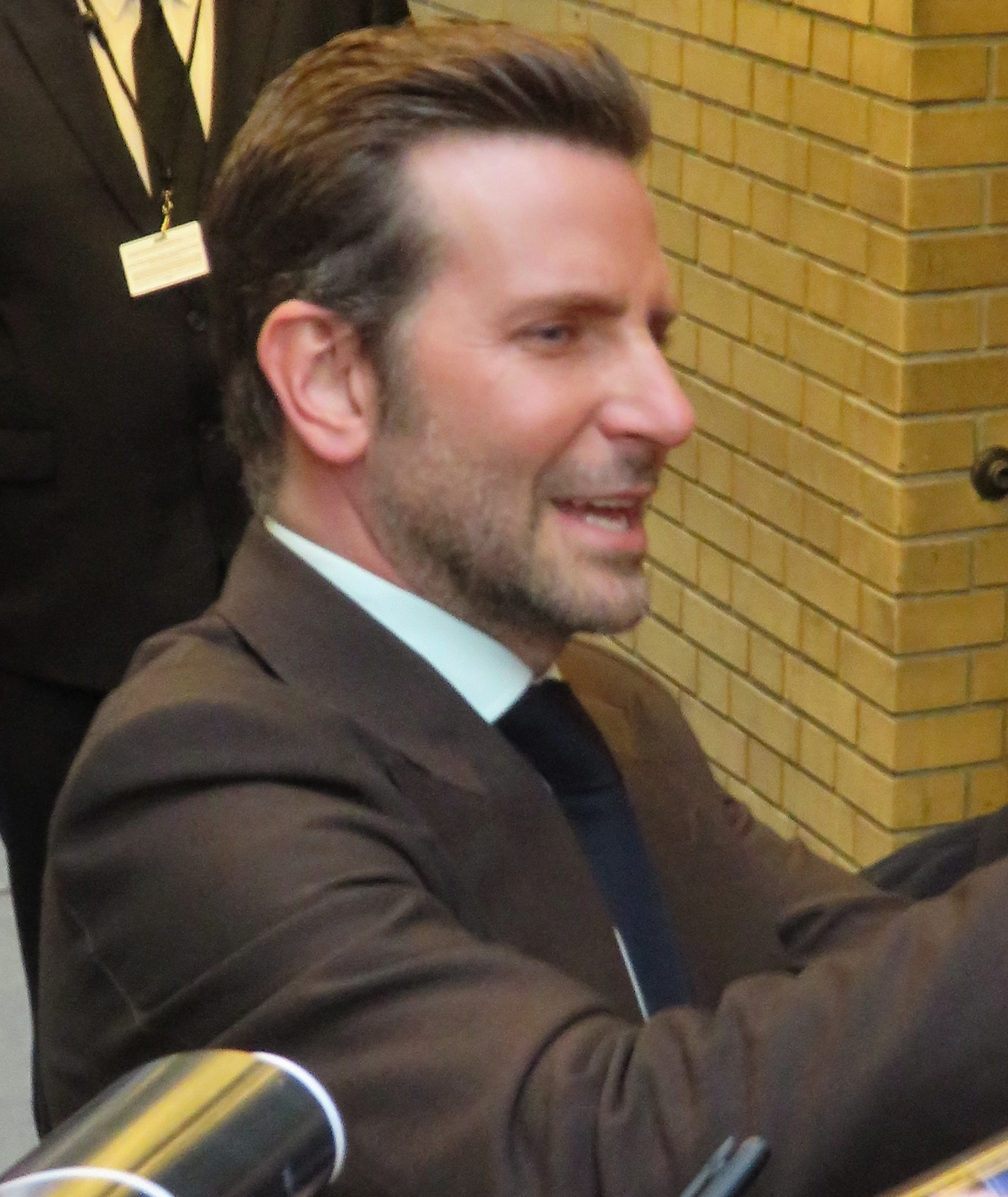
Cooper at the premiere of A Star Is Born in 2018. He starred, co-wrote, co-produced, directed, and contributed to its soundtrack.

Cooper spent nearly four years working on the project, including spending five days a week taking voice, piano, and guitar lessons for six months in preparation for the role. He and Gaga co-wrote and produced most of the songs on the soundtrack for A Star Is Born, which she insisted they record live. Cooper undertook vocal training for 18 months to prepare, including with the help of vocal coach Roger Love. The album contains elements of blues rock, country, and bubblegum pop. Billboard says its lyrics are about wanting change, its struggle, love, romance, and bonding, describing the music as "timeless, emotional, gritty and earnest. They sound like songs written by artists who, quite frankly, are supremely messed up but hit to the core of the listener." The album's release coincided with the film's, and it contains 34 tracks, including 19 original songs. It received generally positive reviews from critics; Mark Kennedy of The Washington Post called it a "five-star marvel" and Ben Beaumont-Thomas of The Guardian termed it an "instant classics full of Gaga's emotional might". Commercially, the soundtrack reached number one in the US, Ireland, and the UK. The record's lead single, "Shallow", was released that September and reached number one in the US, Australia, Ireland, Switzerland, and the UK.

For the film, Cooper received a National Board of Review Award for Best Director and two Golden Globe nominations for Best Actor in a Drama and Best Director. Cooper earned two Grammy nominations for "Shallow": Record of the Year and Best Pop Duo/Group Performance (winning the latter). The soundtrack as a whole received seven Grammy nominations across two different ceremonies. At the 72nd British Academy Film Awards, A Star Is Born received seven nominations, five of which were for Cooper: Best Film, Best Direction, Best Actor in a Leading Role, Best Adapted Screenplay, and Best Film Music, winning only the last of these. As a result, Cooper became the first person with five nominations in a single ceremony in BAFTA's history. Cooper was also nominated for three Academy Awards: Best Picture, Best Actor, and Best Adapted Screenplay. He later remarked he was "embarrassed" by his failure to gain a directing nomination at the ceremony.

Cooper next reunited with Clint Eastwood in The Mule (2018), a crime film based on the life of World War II veteran Leo Sharp in which Cooper played a DEA agent. In 2019, Cooper co-produced Todd Phillips's psychological thriller Joker, starring Joaquin Phoenix. It grossed over $1 billion worldwide, making it the highest-grossing R-rated film of all time, and earned him nominations for an Academy Award for Best Picture and a BAFTA Award for Best Film. Two years later, he dissolved his producing partnership with Phillips, and was not involved in the film's 2024 sequel. Cooper returned as Rocket in Avengers: Endgame (2019), which briefly became the highest-grossing of all time.

Both of Cooper's 2021 releases – the coming-of-age comedy drama Licorice Pizza and the psychological thriller Nightmare Alley – received critical acclaim, but fared poorly at the box office. In his eight-minute role as film producer Jon Peters in Paul Thomas Anderson's Licorice Pizza, Jenelle Riley of Variety found Cooper to be a "scene-stealer". Riley wrote he "somehow manages to be both absurd and menacing. It's the rare scene that is almost too intense to watch, yet you also don't want it to end." Nightmare Alley, an adaption of William Lindsay Gresham's namesake novel, cast Cooper as an ambitious carnival worker, for which he took boxing lessons and performed his first full frontal nude scene, which he found challenging. Owing to the COVID-19 pandemic, the film took a long time to finish. Reviewing his films in 2021, critic Charles Bramesco opined Cooper gave "his most vulnerable and harrowing performance to date" in Nightmare Alley. Cooper garnered a fourth nomination for the Academy Award for Best Picture for producing the film.

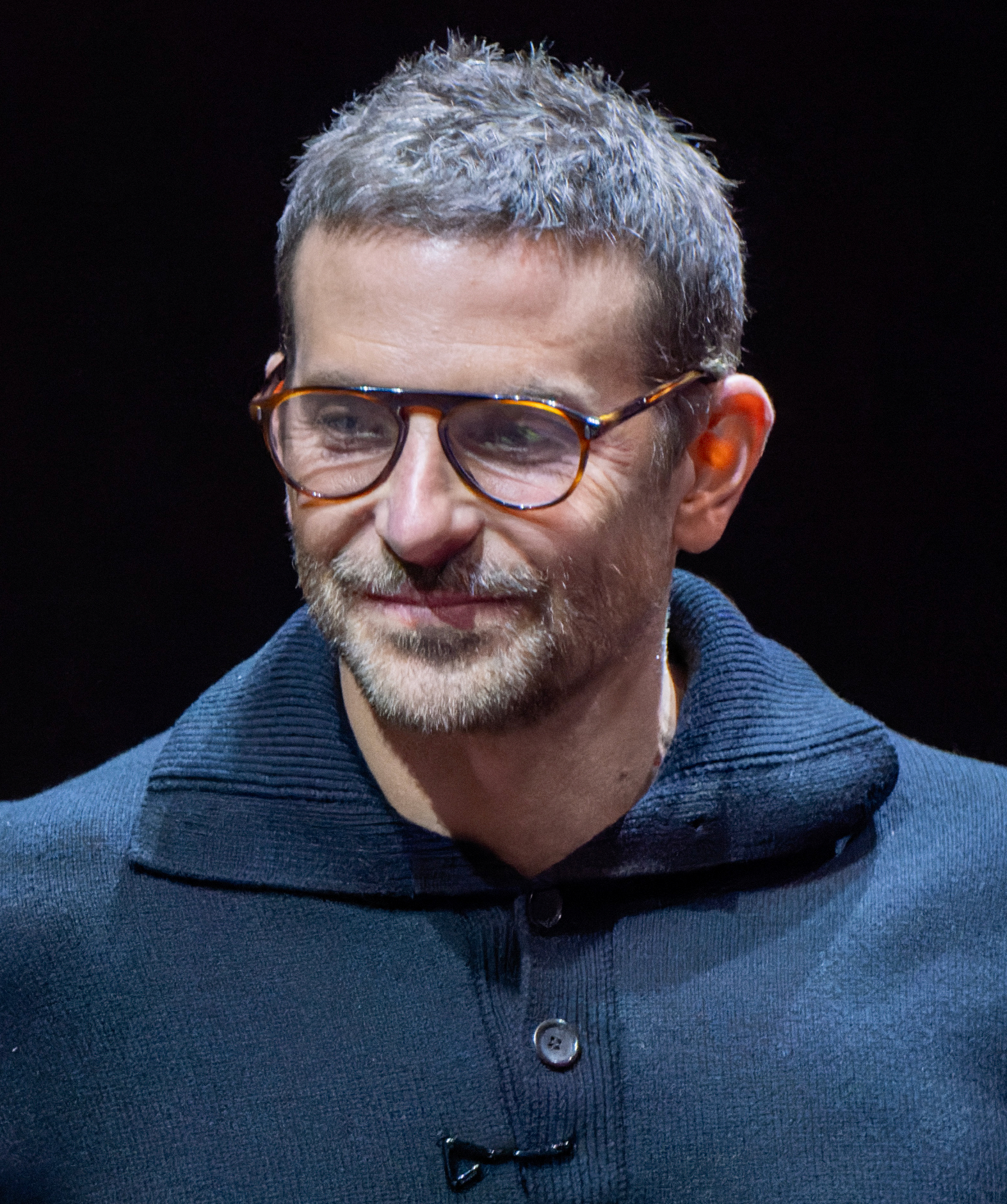
Cooper in 2023

Cooper voiced Rocket in the 2022 Disney+ series I Am Groot and special The Guardians of the Galaxy Holiday Special and did so again in the 2023 film Guardians of the Galaxy Vol. 3. The last of these focused on Rocket's traumatic past. It led Jackson Weaver of CBC News to term Cooper "one of the few genuinely talented live actor turned voice actors". Cooper next directed, produced, and co-wrote Maestro (2023), a biographical drama about the relationship between composer Leonard Bernstein and his wife Felicia Montealegre, in which he also portrayed Bernstein opposite Carey Mulligan's Montealegre. He was hired by filmmaker Steven Spielberg to direct the project after a screening of A Star is Born. Controversy arose over Cooper's use of a prosthetic nose to play Bernstein, which some considered an example of "Jewface". Cooper was defended by both Bernstein's children and the Anti-Defamation League. Reviewing the film for BBC Culture, Nicholas Barber wrote, "Maestro confirms what was suggested by Cooper's directorial debut, A Star Is Born. He has sky-high ambitions, and he has the technical virtuosity and big-hearted sincerity to fulfil those ambitions with flair". He earned two more BAFTA and Golden Globe nominations for his direction and performance, in addition to three more Academy Award nominations for his production, writing, and performance. He also won another Grammy Award for the Maestro soundtrack.

As of February 2025, Cooper will direct and work as a camera operator on the comedy film Is This Thing On? for Searchlight Pictures. He wrote its script with Will Arnett and Mark Chappell. It will star Arnett and Laura Dern, with Cooper appearing in a small role. Also in 2025, Cooper had a cameo appearance as Jor-El, Superman's father, in the DC Universe film Superman.

Cooper, opposite Margot Robbie, is set to star in a prequel to Ocean's Eleven, to be produced by Warner Bros. He has also been announced to portray Duke in a reboot of the G.I. Joe film series directed by Danny McBride for Paramount Pictures, which is scheduled for release in 2028.

== Personal life ==
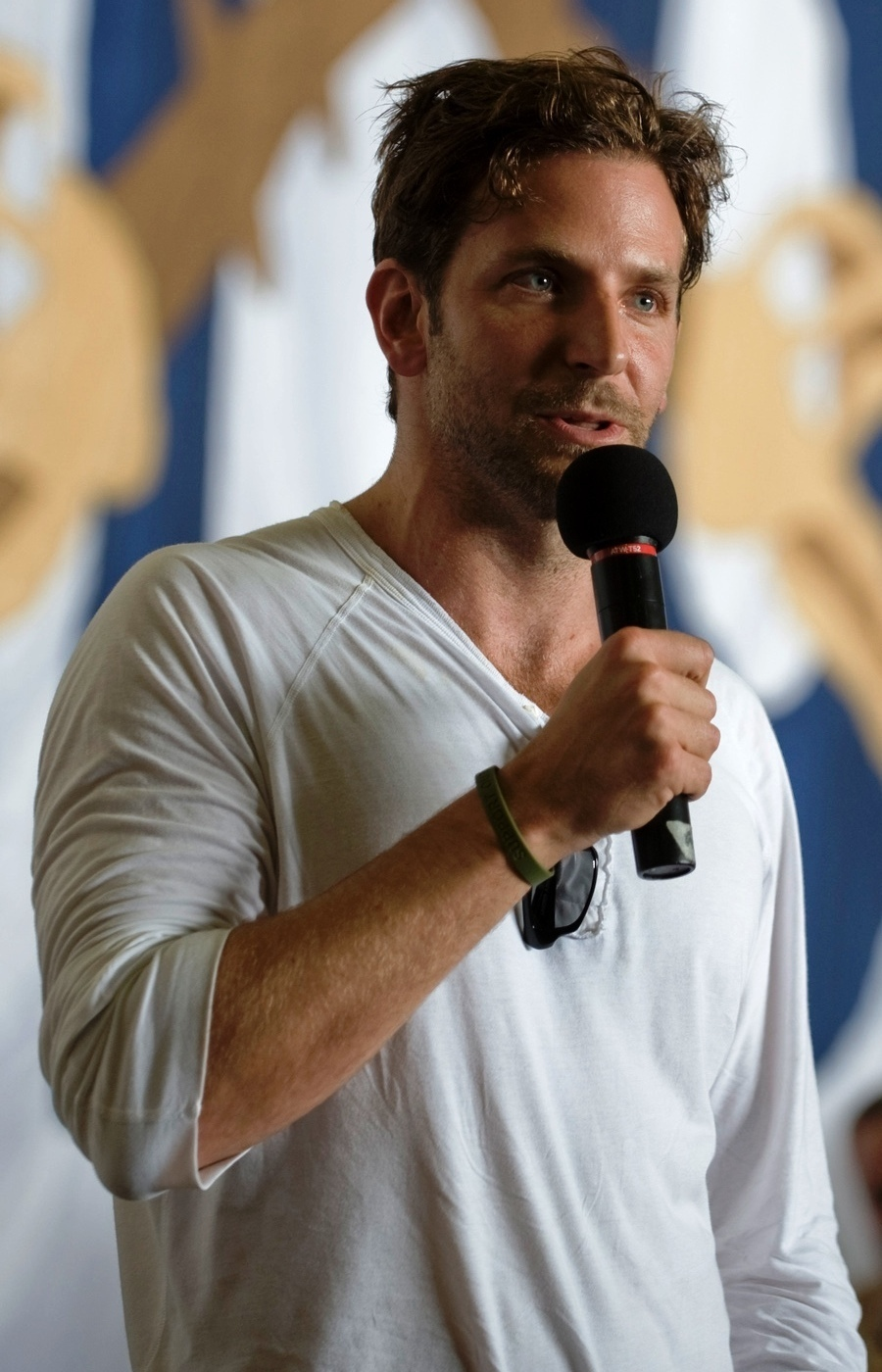
Cooper speaking during a United Service Organizations tour in 2009

Cooper's early years in the entertainment industry were marred with difficulties. When his role in the second season of Alias was demoted to a minuscule part, he considered quitting show business. His substance addiction and doubts about his career triggered thoughts of suicide. Cooper credits his friend and fellow actor Will Arnett with helping him address his substance abuse and seek therapy. Cooper says he has abstained from alcohol and drugs since 2004, remarking that it would have destroyed his life.

I was at a party and deliberately bashed my head on the concrete floor – like, 'Hey, look how tough I am!' And I came up, and blood dripped down. And then I did it again. I spent the night ... [in the] [h]ospital with a sock of ice, waiting for them to stitch me up. I was so concerned what you thought of me, how I was coming across, how I would survive the day. I always felt like an outsider. I just lived in my head. I realized I wasn't going to live up to my potential, and that scared the hell out of me. I thought, 'Wow, I'm actually gonna ruin my life; I'm really gonna ruin it.'

— Cooper, The Hollywood Reporter, September 2012

Cooper became engaged to actress Jennifer Esposito in October 2006, and they married that December. In May 2007, she filed for divorce which was finalized in November. Regarding their short marriage, he explained, "It was just something that happened. The good thing is, we both realized it ... Sometimes you just realize it." Before his marriage to Esposito, he met Renée Zellweger while filming Case 39 in 2006. The media speculated about the nature of their relationship in 2009, when the film was released. They reportedly broke up in 2011.

He dated actress Zoe Saldaña from December 2011 to January 2013. In March 2013, he began dating English model and actress Suki Waterhouse. Their relationship ended two years later. Cooper was in a relationship with Russian model Irina Shayk from April 2015 to June 2019. They have a daughter born in March 2017. Cooper has been in a relationship with model Gigi Hadid since c. late 2023.

Cooper and his family share a close bond. Two years after the death of his father from lung cancer in 2011, he relocated to Los Angeles with his mother. He said that after his father's diagnosis "I was in a very lucky position because I was able to put everything on hold in all aspects of my life and completely focus on taking care of him." He has described the process of his father's treatment as "just simply overwhelming, incredibly stressful, complex and all consuming". He has since supported organizations that help fight cancer. In June 2014, he joined the board of directors for the charity Hole in the Wall Gang Camp, a non-profit organization and summer camp that serves children with chronic illnesses and disabilities. In April 2016, he participated in the launch of the Parker Institute for Cancer Immunotherapy that works for cancer patients. He served as an executive producer for Stand Up to Cancer's Fifth Biennial Telecast, a primetime fundraising special that aired in September.

In 2009, Cooper took part in an Alzheimer's Association campaign that aimed to increase awareness about Alzheimer's disease. He is also one of the members of the Alzheimer's Association Celebrity Champions, an initiative launched for a similar purpose. In 2015, Cooper spoke at The National Geographic Society for the group Got Your 6 to help ensure military veterans are better represented in popular culture. Cooper is a member of the Democratic Party and attended the 2016 Democratic National Convention (when Hillary Clinton received the nomination for president) to hear then-president Barack Obama speak.

Following his role in American Sniper, he clarified his political affiliation for those who assumed he was a conservative and that he regards Barack Obama as "an incredible president". Cooper signed a letter calling for decisive action to stop climate change and biodiversity loss. He expressed solidarity with the people of the Gaza Strip during the Gaza war. As part of a group called Artists4Ceasefire, he signed a letter urging President Joe Biden to call for an immediate ceasefire in Gaza.

Having grown up in Philadelphia, Cooper is a fan of the NFL's Philadelphia Eagles and has made various appearances on behalf of the team besides his Silver Linings Playbook role. He voiced a snowball trying to make amends with Santa Claus in an ESPN promo which referenced an infamous incident from the 1968 Philadelphia Eagles season, and has joined owner Jeffrey Lurie in his box at games, including the Eagles' first Super Bowl victory in 2018.

In 2025, Cooper opened a cheesesteak restaurant in New York City called Danny and Coop's with Philadelphia restaurateur Danny DiGiampietro.

== Media image and artistry ==
The Hollywood Reporter's Bill Phelps describes Cooper as the "epitome of cool". While his friends found him to be a "sweet, exceptionally open man with the defensive, insecure person" before his alcoholism, Brian Klugman (The Words' co-director and a childhood friend) says of him, "There's nobody who's better liked." Todd Phillips (the director of The Hangover Trilogy) believes that Cooper's on-screen persona strongly contradicts with his personality. "He is very vulnerable – insecure is not the right word ... And there's a warmth to him you would never know." Contrary to Phillips, Cooper believes that his personality relates to acting: "I enjoy people, that makes this profession a lot easier, and I can sleep anywhere. That's a skill."

As part of a career analysis, Oliver Lyttelton of IndieWire observed that early in his career, Cooper was typecast as "weaselly boyfriends or best friends in mainstream comedies", but later emerged as one of Hollywood's most accomplished actors after starring in several successful films. Cooper is known for appearing in a range of films; Phelps credited him for "opt[ing] for the challenging and provocative, the small and interesting, risking the laid-back image that propelled him to fame". The Daily Beast's Oliver Lyttelton similarly praised Cooper for stepping outside his comfort zone by accepting parts that might initially not seem like perfect matches. Time magazine wrote of Cooper's craft: "It's hard to make people, especially your friends, forget who you are onscreen. But Bradley's that good."

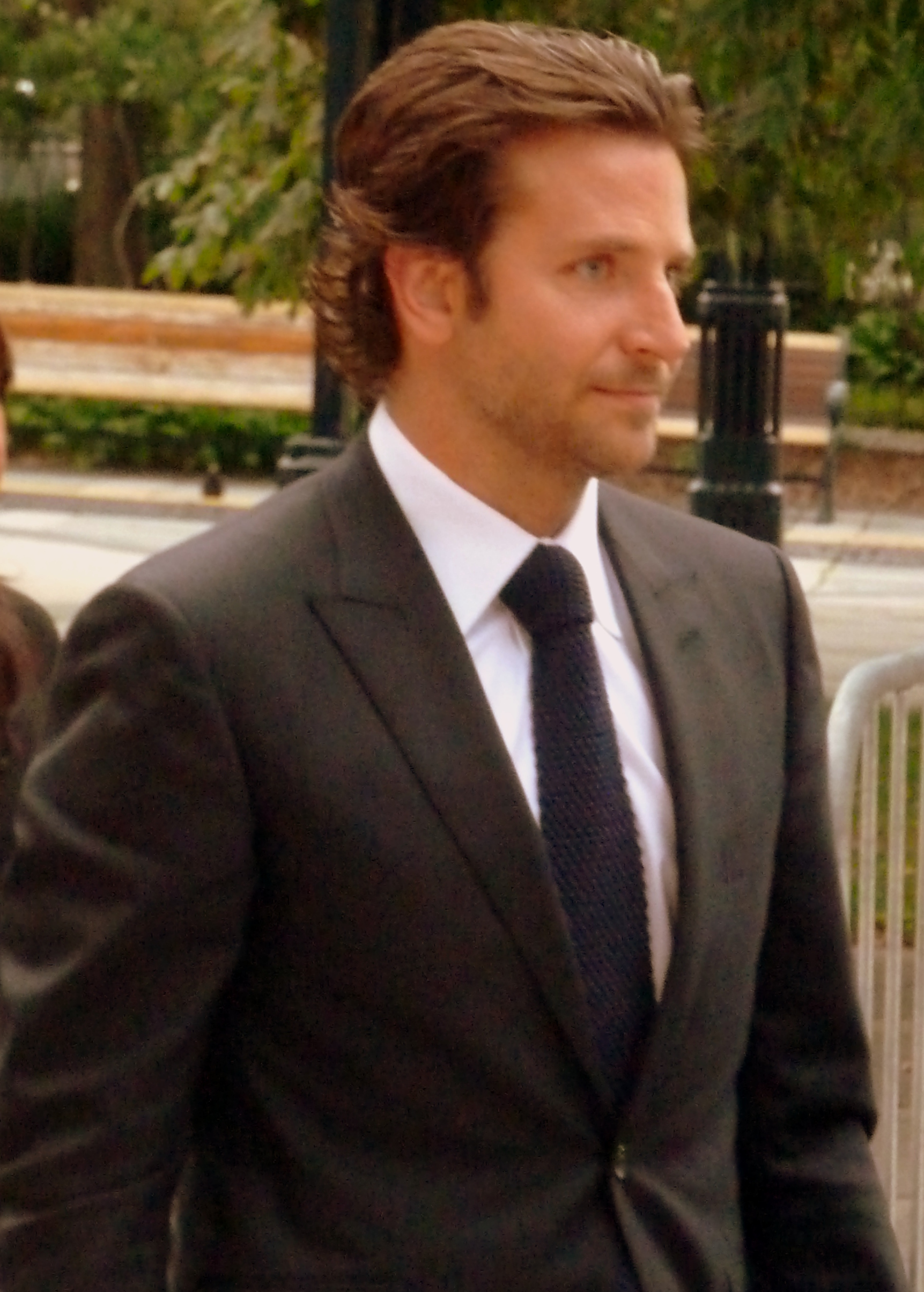
Cooper at the 2012 Toronto International Film Festival

Cooper cites actor Daniel Day-Lewis as his favorite. Films that had influences include the French romantic drama Hiroshima mon amour (1959), the coming-of-age feature The Loneliness of the Long Distance Runner (1962), the war films The Deer Hunter (1978) and Apocalypse Now (1979), The Elephant Man (1980), and comedies featuring Richard Pryor. Reviewing his performances in Licorice Pizza and Nightmare Alley, critic Charles Bramesco likened Cooper's screen persona to Joseph Merrick, a severely deformed man in the Victorian era, whom Cooper played in the 2014 Broadway play The Elephant Man. Bramesco wrote:

[Merrick] declined external help and instead conjured a certain animalistic quality from within himself to be measured against his core humanity. That negotiation between civility and our baser impulses – the ego versus the id, for the psychoanalytically inclined – forms the foundation of Cooper's classical leading-man screen persona. One of our last true movie stars has spent the majority of his career reiterating the internal tension of the role he's clung to like Rosebud, coaxing out the troubled chaos from within put-together men.

Cooper's sex appeal has been picked up by several media outlets, including People magazine, which named him Sexiest Man Alive in 2011. He was initially uncomfortable with the accolade, but later found it funny. In a June 2011 interview with Esquire, Cooper said, "Fall in love with my looks, fine, but stay with me for my talent." Also that year, he was dubbed International Man of the Year by GQ and appeared in AskMen's 49 most influential men. He ranked tenth on Empire's list of the 100 Sexiest Movie Stars in 2013.

He was one of the highest-paid actors in the world from 2013 to 2015 and in 2019, earning $28 million, $46 million, $41.5 million, and $57 million, respectively. Forbes ranked him first on their Celebrity 100: Ones To Watch list in 2013. In 2014, 2015, and 2019, he was featured on Celebrity 100, a list based on the income and popularity of celebrities, as selected annually by Forbes. Time magazine named him one of the 100 most influential people in the world in 2015. Cooper's films have earned a total of $13 billion worldwide.

== Acting credits and awards ==
Cooper has received one BAFTA, one Screen Actors Guild Award, and three Grammy Awards. He has been nominated for 12 Academy Awards, six Golden Globe Awards, and one Tony Award. According to the review aggregator website Rotten Tomatoes and box-office website Box Office Mojo, Cooper's most critically and commercially successful films include Wedding Crashers (2005), The Hangover (2009), Limitless (2011), Silver Linings Playbook (2012), American Hustle (2013), Guardians of the Galaxy (2014), American Sniper (2014), and A Star Is Born (2018). Among his stage roles, he appeared in a Broadway revival of The Elephant Man (2014–2015), for which he was nominated for a Tony Award for Best Actor in a Play.

Awards and nominations received by Cooper's films
Year	Title	Academy Awards		BAFTA Awards		Golden Globe Awards	
Year	Title	Nominations	Wins	Nominations	Wins	Nominations	Wins
2018	A Star Is Born	8	1	7	1	5	1
2023	Maestro	7	0	7	0	4	0

Directed Academy Award performances
Under Cooper's direction, these actors have received Academy Award nominations for their performances in their respective roles.

Year	Performer	Film	Result
Academy Award for Best Actor
2018	Himself	A Star Is Born	Nominated
2023	Himself	Maestro	Nominated
Academy Award for Best Actress
2018	Lady Gaga	A Star Is Born	Nominated
2023	Carey Mulligan	Maestro	Nominated
Academy Award for Best Supporting Actor
2018	Sam Elliott	A Star Is Born	Nominated

== Discography ==
- A Star Is Born (with Lady Gaga) (2018)
