= Maestro (soundtrack) =

2023 soundtrack album

Maestro (Original Soundtrack)

Soundtrack album by Leonard Bernstein, Yannick Nézet-Séguin, Bradley Cooper and the London Symphony Orchestra
- Released: November 10, 2023 (digital); December 1, 2023 (physical)
- Recorded: 2021–2023
- Studios: AIR Studios, London
- Genres: Classical; orchestral
- Length: 62:59
- Label: Deutsche Grammophon
- Producers: Bradley Cooper; Leonard Bernstein

Maestro (Original Soundtrack) is the soundtrack to the 2023 film Maestro that is centered around the life of composer Leonard Bernstein and his wife Felicia Montealegre. Directed by Bradley Cooper, and starring himself as Bernstein with Carey Mulligan as Montealegre, the film's soundtrack features Bernstein's works from musicals and operas as well as compositions from Gustav Mahler and Ludwig van Beethoven, amongst others. All of Bernstein's compositions were arranged and performed by the London Symphony Orchestra conducted by Yannick Nézet-Séguin. The soundtrack was released by the Deutsche Grammophon label digitally on November 10, 2023 and in physical formats on December 1. In 2025, the soundtrack was awarded a Grammy for Best Compilation Soundtrack For Visual Media at the 67th Grammy Awards.

== Background ==
The soundtrack consisted of compositions from Bernstein's musicals and operettas such as West Side Story, Candide, On the Town, Mass, Chichester Psalms and Symphonies Nos. 2 and 3, which were handpicked by Cooper. Apart from that it also featured works from Gustav Mahler, Ludwig van Beethoven, W. C. Handy, Robert Schumann and William Walton that were used to illustrate key moments in Bernstein's career and marriage.

All of Bernstein's compositions were performed by the London Symphony Orchestra and Chorus under the direction of pianist-conductor Yannick Nézet-Séguin, who also served as Cooper's conducting coach and trained him for six years to perform the orchestral conducting live on sets. Though Nézet-Séguin never met Bernstein in his life (he was 15 when Bernstein died in 1990) he cites him as the biggest inspiration "how emotional he was on the podium and how he was unashamed of being very physical when he conducted". While simultaneously conducting the orchestra, Nézet-Séguin would rehearse thoroughly with the members and interpret them and guide Cooper while filming on sets.

In the final act of the film, the 1987 single "It's the End of the World as We Know It (And I Feel Fine)" from the American rock band R.E.M. is heard when Bernstein teaches young students on conducting. Given that the song's release was three years before his death, it signifies on how Bernstein enjoys his final years in his life as he is seen dancing with the young male student in a club as the credits near. Time-critic Olivia B. Waxman described its appearance "a cheeky, self-aware nod to Bernstein's legacy and his influence on musicians of all genres" but also its placement being timely due to the song's resurgence of popularity in March 2020, during the COVID-19 pandemic.

== Release ==
On October 19, 2023, Deutsche Grammophon announced the release of the soundtrack album set for November 10 in digital streaming platforms and physically on December 1, in CD and vinyl formats. An excerpt from the finale of Mahler's Symphony No. 2 "Resurrection" was released as a single on October 20. It was performed by soprano vocalist Rosa Feola, mezza-soprano vocalist Isabel Leonard, the London symphony chorus and orchestra conducted by Cooper.

Deutsche Grammophon president Clemens Trautmann said that the album "reflects our ongoing passion for collaborating with film-makers and bringing the worlds of cinema and classical music together". The company which re-issued several of Bernstein's compositions, had produced a 10-CD box set Digital Library A–Z that presented complete recordings of Bernstein's works encompass over 260 hours that were remastered in Dolby Atmos and released in conjunction with Decca Records during October and November 2023.

As a "Deutsche Grammophon" store exclusive, the physical editions consisted of CDs and 180-gram double LP variants of black colored, and crystal clear grey colored CD packaging that includes a photobook regarding the music production process. The prices range from €18.99–57.99 (US$20.74–63.33).

== Track listing ==
No.	Title	Writer(s)	Performer(s)/Conductor(s)	Length
1.	"Bernstein: Symphonic Suite from On the Waterfront / Manfred, Op. 115: Overture / Fancy Free: Var. 1 (Galop)"	Leonard Bernstein; Robert Schumann	London Symphony Orchestra; Yannick Nézet-Séguin; Victoria Ruggiero	5:16
2.	"On the Town: Lonely Town. Pas de deux"	Bernstein	London Symphony Orchestra; Nézet-Séguin	2:24
3.	"I Get Carried Away / You've Got That Look (That Leaves Me Weak)"	Bernstein	Nick Blaemire; Mallory Portnoy; Kate Eastman	3:38
4.	"Trouble in Tahiti: Interlude"	Bernstein	Antonia Butler; Michael Clarke; Mark Brown; London Symphony Orchestra; Nézet-Séguin	0:32
5.	"Candide: Paris Waltz"	Bernstein	London Symphony Orchestra; Nézet-Séguin	0:53
6.	"Facsimile: Molto adagio"	Bernstein	London Symphony Orchestra; Nézet-Séguin	1:12
7.	"Fancy Free: Enter Three Sailors / Fancy Free: Var. 3 (Danzon) / On the Town: New York, New York"	Bernstein	Tony Yazbeck; Clyde Alves; Jay Armstrong Johnson; Ruth Mense; Dicky Tarrach; Thissy Thiers; London Symphony; Nézet-Séguin; New York Philharmonic; Bernstein	3:34
8.	"Anniversaries for Orchestra: X. For Felicia Montealegre / Interview (Dialogue) / Songfest: To What You Said"	Bernstein	London Symphony Orchestra; Nézet-Séguin	6:07
9.	"St. Louis Blues (Concerto Grosso) / Symphony No. 5 in C-sharp minor, Pt. 3: Adagietto"	W. C. Handy; Gustav Mahler	Louis Armstrong Quintet; Lewisohn Stadium Symphony Orchestra; Vienna Philharmonic; Bernstein	3:50
10.	"Candide: Make Our Garden Grow"	Bernstein	Bradley Cooper; Alex Lacamoire; Philadelphia Symphonic Choir; Nézet-Séguin	2:09
11.	"West Side Story: Prologue"	Bernstein	London Symphony; Nézet-Séguin	1:25
12.	"Mass: XVII. Pax Communion"	Bernstein	Ann De Renais; Philip John Sheffield; Samuel Oladeinde; London Symphony Chorus; London Symphony Orchestra; Nézet-Séguin	7:24
13.	"Façade – An Entertainment: Sir Beelzebub"	William Walton	Carey Mulligan; Zachary Booth	0:33
14.	"Symphony No. 2 in C minor "Resurrection": V. Finale. In Tempo des Scherzos"	Mahler	Cooper; Rosa Feola; Isabel Leonard; London Symphony Chorus; London Symphony Orchestra; Nézet-Séguin	6:16
15.	"Symphony No. 2 "The Age of Anxiety", Pt. 1. A. The Prologue"	Bernstein	New York Philharmonic; Bernstein	0:58
16.	"The Clapping Song (Clap Pat Clap Slap)"	Lincoln Chase	Shirley Ellis	1:13
17.	"A Quiet Place: Postlude"	Bernstein	Victoria Ruggiero	2:00
18.	"Symphony No. 8 in F major, Op. 93"	Ludwig van Beethoven	Cooper; The Orchestra Now; Nézet-Séguin	3:03
19.	"Chichester Psalms: Psalm 23"	Bernstein	London Symphony Orchestra; London Symphony Chorus; Nézet-Séguin	4:59
20.	"Candide: Overture"	Bernstein	London Symphony Orchestra; Nézet-Séguin	4:36
21.	"Symphony No. 3 "Kaddish": II. Din-Torah"	Bernstein	London Symphony Orchestra; Anne De Renais; Nézet-Séguin	0:57
Total length:				62:59

== Chart performance ==
Chart performance for Maestro (Original Soundtrack)
Chart (2023)	Peak position
US Traditional Classical Albums (Billboard)	5

== Release history ==
Region	Date	Format(s)	Label	Ref.
Various	November 10, 2023	Digital download; streaming	Deutsche Grammophon	
Various	December 1, 2023	CD	Deutsche Grammophon	
Various	December 1, 2023	Vinyl	Deutsche Grammophon	
