= Dark Fields =

Dark Fields may refer to:

- Darkfield, Logitek's name for a type of sensor used on an optical mouse
- Dark field, a type of illumination used in dark field microscopy
- The Dark Fields, a 2001 novel by Alan Glynn
  - The Dark Fields, the original name of the 2011 film Limitless, based on the novel
- Dark Fields (2006 film), a horror film directed by Mark McNabb and Al Randall
- Dark Fields (2009 film), a horror film directed by Douglas Shulze
- Dark Fields (album), a 1997 album by Show of Hands

== See also ==
- Dunkelfeld
- Dark (disambiguation)
- Field (disambiguation)
