= Tony Pollard (archaeologist) =

British archaeologist (born 1965)

- Born: 1965; Macclesfield, England
- Education: University of Glasgow
- Scientific career
- Fields: Archaeology of conflict

Tony Pollard (born 1965) is an archaeologist specialising in the archaeology of conflict. He is Professor of Conflict History and Archaeology at the University of Glasgow, where is based in the Scottish Centre for War Studies and Conflict Archaeology. He academic lead and an archaeological co-director of the charity Waterloo Uncovered. He was the co-presenter of the BBC series Two Men in a Trench, co-founder of the Journal of Conflict Archaeology, and guest expert on Time Team.

== Early life ==
Tony Pollard was born in Macclesfield in the north of England in 1965. He moved to Oban on the west coast of Scotland in the late 1970s. He studied archaeology at the University of Glasgow, and after graduating continued at the University taking a PhD on prehistoric hunter gatherers.

== Career ==
After obtaining his PhD in 1995 he spent two years living in Brighton while working for the field archaeology unit of University College London. In 1997 he returned to work for Glasgow University Archaeological Research Division (GUARD). Following a first visit to South Africa in 1999, he carried out a project investigating battlefields from the Anglo-Zulu War of 1879. In 2000, he co-organised, with Phil Freeman of the University of Liverpool, the first international conference on battlefield archaeology. He then went on to make two series of Two Men in a Trench with Neil Oliver which introduced the public to the archaeology of British battlefields. He continues to appear in television documentary series and was a regular expert in the National Geographic series Nazi Megastructures.

The Centre for Battlefield Archaeology was founded in 2006 and Pollard appointed its director. Since then the centre has gone on to offer the world's first post-graduate course in battlefield and conflict archaeology, while also publishing the Journal of Conflict Archaeology. The centre has carried out various projects which include the examination of Jacobite battlefields in Scotland, including Culloden, and investigating of British and Australian mass graves from World War I at Fromelles in France.

Since 2015 Pollard has served as an Archaeological co-director for the veteran support charity Waterloo Uncovered, conducting archaeology on the battlefield of Waterloo in Belgium alongside veterans and serving personnel. In 2022, Pollard led the charity's Falklands War Mapping Project, a field mapping project which examined the surviving archaeology of the Falklands War on the Falklands Islands, incorporating the perspectives of two British veterans of the Battle of Mount Tumbledown.

== Writing ==
Pollard has written numerous papers and articles on archaeology (eg. as editor of Journal of Conflict Archaeology) and military history and edited several books on subjects as diverse as the early prehistory of Scotland and the archaeology of death. Along with Neil Oliver he wrote the two books accompanying the Two Men in a Trench programmes. As Archaeological co-director of the charity Waterloo Uncovered, Pollard has written several papers and articles on archaeological work conducted on the site of the Battle of Waterloo. Together with historians Bernard Wilkin and Robin Schäfer, he discovered that the bones of the soldiers killed at the Battle of Waterloo were dug out and sold to the sugar factories to be turned into spodium.

In 2008, his first novel, The Minutes of the Lazarus Club, a thriller based on the life of the famous engineer Isambard Kingdom Brunel, was published by Michael Joseph. It was republished in 2009 by Penguin under the title of The Secrets of the Lazarus Club.
