= Nicholas J. Saunders =

British academic archaeologist and anthropologish

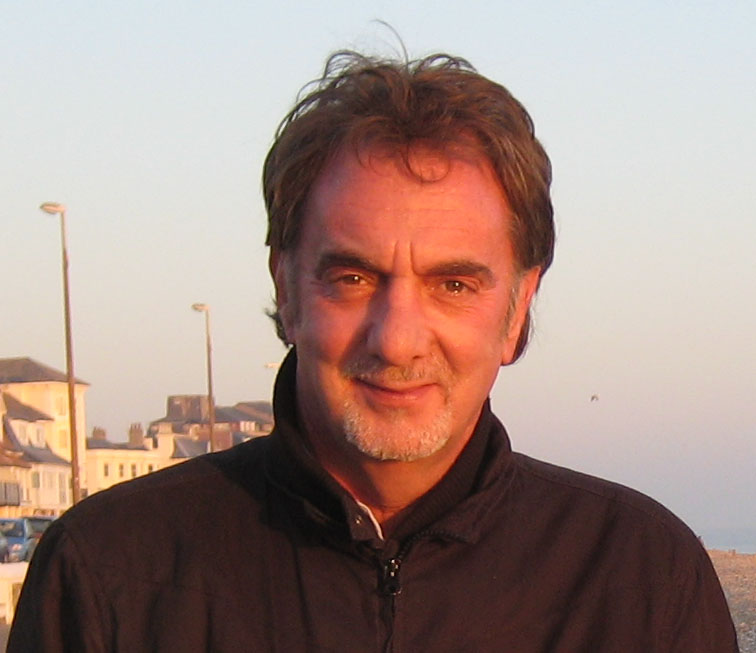
- Nicholas Saunders
- Born: 20 January 1953 (age 73)

Nicholas J. Saunders (born 20 January 1953) is a British academic archaeologist and anthropologist. He was educated at the universities of Sheffield (BA Archaeology, 1979), Cambridge (MPhil Social Anthropology, 1981), and Southampton (PhD Archaeology, 1991). He has held teaching and research positions at the National Autonomous University of Mexico, the University of the West Indies, Dumbarton Oaks, Washington D.C., and at University College London, where he was Reader in Material Culture, and undertook a major British Academy sponsored investigation into the material culture anthropology of the First World War (1998–2004). Between 2006 and 2014, he was co-director of the Great Arab Revolt Project (GARP), investigating the archaeology and anthropology of the 1916-1918 Arab Revolt in southern Jordan. As of 2014 Saunders was Professor in the Department of Anthropology and Archaeology at the University of Bristol, where he was responsible for the MA programmes in historical archaeology and conflict archaeology. As of 2018, he is Emeritus Professor of Material Culture in that department. He is a prominent contributor to the nascent field of conflict archaeology, and has authored and edited numerous academic publications in the field. In addition to his research specialising in the anthropology of 20th-century conflicts and the archaeology of World War I theatres in Belgium, France and the Middle East, Saunders has also conducted extensive fieldwork and research in pre-Columbian and historical archaeology of the Americas. He has been involved with major museum exhibitions in London, Ypres (Belgium), Tübingen (Germany), and at the Centre Pompidou-Metz (France). Saunders has investigated and published on material cultures and landscapes of Mesoamerica, South America, and the Caribbean. His most recent research has been on the aesthetics of brilliance and colour in indigenous Amerindian symbolism, an extensive survey investigation of the Nazca Lines in Peru, the anthropological archaeology of twentieth-century conflict (especially the First World War) and its legacies along the Soca (Isonzo) Front on the Slovenian-Italian border, and the conflict artworks of the Chinese Labour Corps on the Western Front during and after the First World War.

== Major book publications ==
- Curating the Great War, (ed.) (with P. Cornish) 2022: London: Routledge.
- Feuilles de Poilus: Decorated leaves from the First World War, (with D. Dendooven and Luc Volatier) 2022: Ieper: In Flanders Fields Museum.
- Conflict Landscapes: Materiality and Meaning in Contested Places, (ed.) (with P. Cornish) 2021. London: Routledge.
- Desert Insurgency: Archaeology, T. E. Lawrence and the Arab Revolt. 2020. Oxford: Oxford University Press.https://doi.org/10.1093/oso/9780198722007.001.0001
- Modern Conflict and the Senses, (ed.) (with P. Cornish) 2017. London: Routledge.https://doi.org/10.4324/9781315682228
- Bodies in Conflict: Corporeality, Materiality and Transformation, (ed.) (with P. Cornish) 2014. London: Routledge. https://doi.org/10.4324/9781315851846
- The Poppy: From Ancient Egypt to Flanders Fields to Afghanistan, 2013. London: Oneworld. https://doi.org/10.3366/anh.2014.0239
- Beyond the Dead Horizon: Studies in Modern Conflict Archaeology, (ed.) 2012. Oxford: Oxbow. https://doi.org/10.2307/j.ctvh1dwsh
- To Capture the Sun: Gold of Ancient Panama, (with R.Cooke, J.Hoopes, and J.Quilter). 2012. Gilcrease Museum and University of Oklahoma Press.
- Contested Objects, (ed.) (with P. Cornish). 2009. Abingdon, Routledge. https://doi.org/10.4324/9780203873854
- Images of Conflict, (ed.) 2009. Newcastle, Cambridge Scholars.
- Killing Time: Archaeology and the First World War, 2007. Stroud: Sutton.
- Alexander's Tomb, 2006. New York: Basic.
- Peoples of the Caribbean, 2005. San Diego: ABC-Clio.
- Trench Art: Lost Worlds of the Great War, (with D. Dendooven) (2004). Ypres: In Flanders Fields Museum.
- Ancient Americas: The Great Civilizations, 2004. Sutton.
- Matters of Conflict (ed.) 2004. Abingdon: Routledge. https://doi.org/10.4324/9780203502549
- Trench Art: Materialities and Memories of War, 2003. Oxford: Berg. https://doi.org/10.4324/9781003087267
- Icons of Power (ed.) 1998. London: Routledge. https://doi.org/10.4324/9780203383827
- Astronomies and Cultures (ed.) (with C.Ruggles) 1993. Niwot: University Press of Colorado.
- Ancient America: Contributions to New World Archaeology, (ed.) 1992. Oxford: Oxbow.
- People of the Jaguar, 1989. London: Souvenir.

== Major article publications ==
- Crafting War, Handling Conflict: Trench Art, from Object to Embodied World. 2026. In, J. Way, H. Smith, and A.R. Jekabson (eds.) Craft & War: Makers, Users, and Craft Practices since the 19th Century, pp 47-62. London: Bloomsbury.
- Materialising Spirits: Smoke and power in the Americas/Espíritus que se materializan: Humo y poder en el continente Americano. 2026. In, M. Goretti y A.M. Llamazares (eds.), Pipas Sagradas de América Originaria: El arte de fumar y otros y otros rituales chamánicos/The Art of Smoking and other Shamanic Rituals, pp 407-413. Buenos Aires: Fundación CEPPA.
- Shimmering Worlds: A sense of brilliance, and the lightness of being. Current Obsession Magazine, 9 The Radical Surface Issue 2025 (June), pp 1-18. Amsterdam
- Conflict landscapes at the edge of Empire: Archaeology and Environment of a Desert Insurgency – the Arab Revolt, 1916-18. 2024. In, K.S. Jobst, O. Nagornaia, and K. von Lingen (eds.) The Great War and the Anthropocene: Empire and Environment, Soldiers and Civilians on the Eastern Front, pp 359-380. Leiden: Brill.
- Modern Conflict Archaeology: Interdisciplinary Reflections and the 'Written in the Landscape' Research Project. 2024. In, W. Kofler Engel and G. Piccarolo (eds.) Written in the Landscape: Places, Traces and Memories of the First World War in the Sesto Dolomites, pp 106-121. Bozen-Bolzano: Free University of Bozen-Bolzano Press.
- Placemaking at Les Blanches Banques, Jersey’s First World War Prisoner of War Camp. 2023. The Antiquaries Journal 103: 407-437. (with H. Mytum, G. Carr, and R. Philpott).
- Identity, Place and Memory in First World War Trench Art Coins. 2022. In, R. Kelleher (ed.) Defaced! Money, Conflict, Protest, pp 96–101. Cambridge and London: Fitzwilliam Museum and Paul Holberton.
- East of the Jordan: Curating and forgetting the First World War and Arab Revolt along the Hejaz Railway. 2022.In, P. Cornish and N.J. Saunders (eds.)Curating the Great War, pp 107–127. London: Routledge.
- The education of attention: Visualizing conflict at the In Flanders Fields Museum, 1998-2021. 2022 In, D. Dendooven and P. Trogh (eds.), Nous irons en Flandres: Festschrift for Piet Chielens pp 326–335. Ieper: In Flanders Fields Museum.
- The dead and their spaces: Origins and meanings in modern conflict landscapes. 2021. In, N.J. Saunders and P. Cornish (eds.), Conflict Landscapes: Materiality and meaning in contested places, pp 3–33. London: Routledge.
- Forged in conflict: Francis Buckley, the First World War, and British Prehistory. 2020. International Journal of Historical Archaeology 7 Nov 2020 online, with S. Griffiths.
- Zeitgeist archaeology: conflict, identity and ideology at Prague Castle, 1918–2018. 2019. Antiquity 93 (370):1009-1025. https://doi.org/10.15184/aqy.2019.107
- Traces of being: Interdisciplinary perspectives on First World War Conflict Landscapes. 2018. In, S.Daly, M.Salvante and V. Wilcox (eds.), Landscapes of the First World War, pp 209–224. https://doi.org/10.1007/978-3-319-89411-9_12
- Pearl's Treasure:The Trench Art Collection of an Australian Sapper. 2018. In, L. Slade (ed.), Sappers and Shrapnel:Contemporary Art and the Art of the Trenches, pp 13–27. Adelaide:Art Gallery of South Australia.
- Trench Art: Objects and people in conflict. In, J. Bourke (ed.), War and Art: A Visual History of Modern Conflict, 2017, pp 209–215. London: Reaktion.
- Materiality, space and distance in the First World War. In, N.J.Saunders and P. Cornish (eds.), Modern Conflict and the Senses, 2017, pp 29–42. London: Routledge.
- Bodies in trees: a matter of being in Great War landscapes. In, P. Cornish and N.J. Saunders (eds.), Bodies in Conflict: Corporeality, Materiality and Transformation, 2014, 22–38. London: Routledge.
- Travail et nostalgie sur le front de l’Ouest : l’Art des tranchées chinois et la Première guerre mondiale. In, Li Ma (ed.), Les travailleurs chinois en France dans la Première Guerre mondiale, 2012, pp 435–451. Paris: CNRS.
- Desert Labyrinth: Lines, Landscape and Meaning at Nazca, Peru. (with C. Ruggles). Antiquity 2012, Vol 86, pp 1126–1140. https://doi.org/10.1017/s0003598x00048298
- Fire on the Desert: Conflict Archaeology and the Great Arab Revolt in Southern Jordan 1916–1918. (with N. Faulkner). Antiquity 2010, Vol 84 (324), pp 514–527.
- People in objects: Individuality and the quotidian in the material culture of war. In, C. White (ed.), The Materiality of Individuality 2009, pp 37–55. New York: Springer.
- The Cosmic Earth: Materiality and Mineralogy in the Americas. In N. Boivin and M.A. Owoc (eds.), Soil, Stones and Symbols: Cultural Perceptions of the Mineral World 2004, pp 123–141. London: UCL Press.
- 'Catching the light': Technologies of power and enchantment in Pre-Columbian goldworking. In, J. Quilter and J.W. Hoopes (eds.), Gold and Power in Ancient Costa Rica, Panama, and Colombia 2003, pp 15–47. Washington D.C.: Dumbarton Oaks.
- Crucifix, Calvary, and Cross: materiality and spirituality in Great War Landscapes. World Archaeology 2003, Vol 35 (1), pp 7–21. https://doi.org/10.1080/0043824032000078045
- Excavating memories: archaeology and the Great War, 1914–2001. Antiquity 2002, Vol 76 (291), pp 101–8.
- A Dark Light: Reflections on Obsidian in Mesoamerica. World Archaeology 2001, Vol 33 (2), pp 220–236. https://doi.org/10.1080/00438240120079262
- Matter and memory in the landscapes of conflict: The Western Front 1914–1999. In, B. Bender and M. Winer (eds.), Contested Landscapes: Movement, Exile and Place 2001, pp 37–53. Oxford: Berg.
- Bodies of metal, shells of memory: 'Trench Art' and the Great War Re-cycled. Journal of Material Culture 2000, Vol 5 (1), pp 43–67.
- Biographies of brilliance: Pearls, transformations of matter and being, c. AD 1492. World Archaeology 1999, Vol 31 (2)pp 243–57.
- Stealers of light, traders in brilliance: Amerindian metaphysics in the mirror of conquest. RES: Anthropology and Aesthetics 1998, Vol 33 (1): 225–52.
- Zemís, trees and symbolic landscapes: three Taíno carvings from Jamaica. (with D.Gray). Antiquity 1996, Vol 70, No.270, pp 801–812.
- Predators of culture: Jaguar symbolism and Mesoamerican Elites. World Archaeology 1994, Vol. 26:1, pp 104–117. https://doi.org/10.1080/00438243.1994.9980264
