= Paul Leonard-Morgan =

Scottish composer (born 1974)

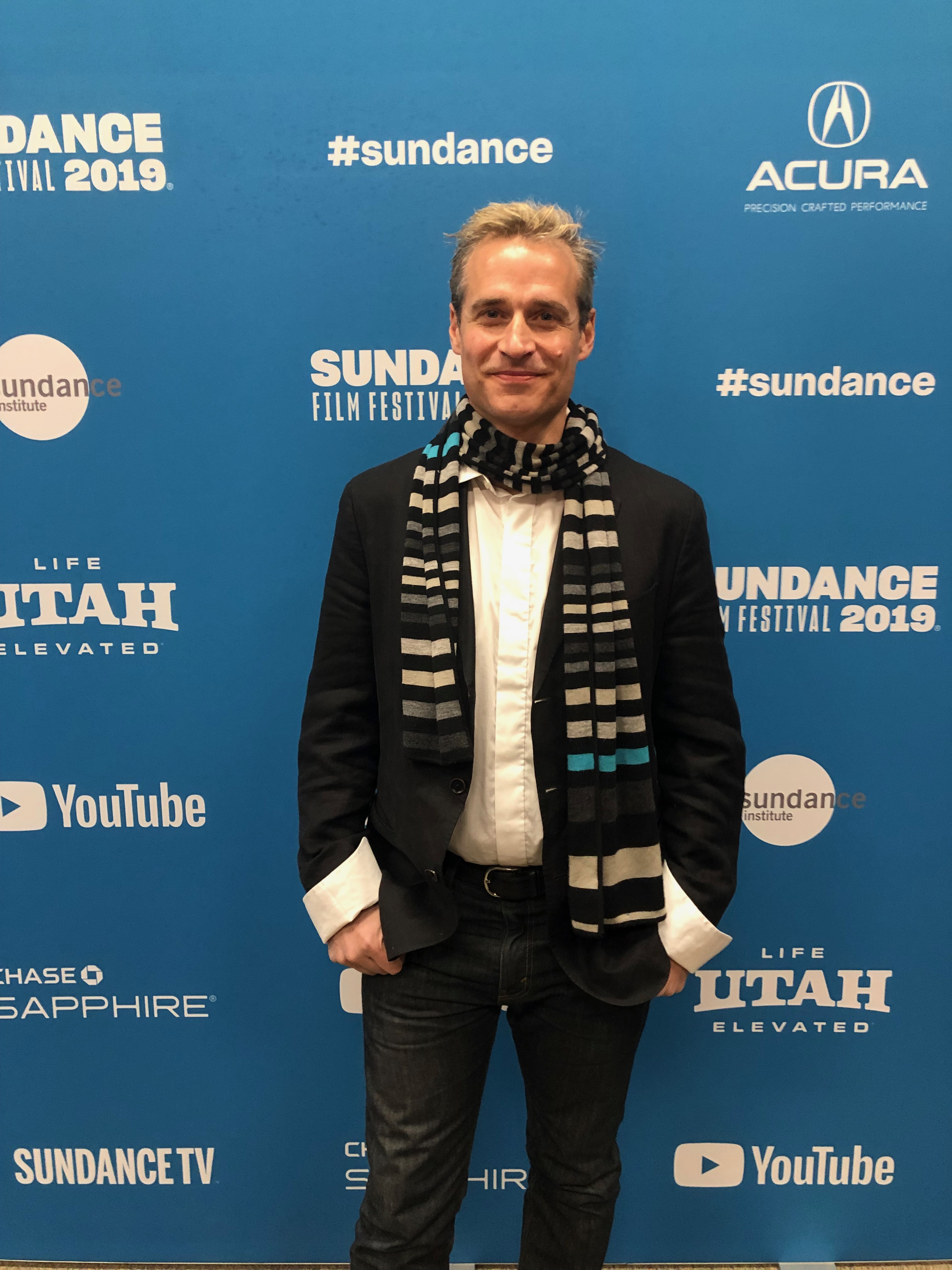
- Leonard-Morgan in 2019

Background information
- Born: 1974 (age 51–52); Scotland
- Genres: Film score; classical
- Occupation: Composer
- Instrument: Piano
- Years active: 1997–present
- Labels: Atlantic; Madison Gate; Hollywood
- Website: paulleonardmorgan.com

Paul Leonard-Morgan (born 1974) is a Scottish composer particularly known for his work in scoring for television and film. He won a Scottish BAFTA for the film Reflections upon the Origin of the Pineapple (2000), which was his first film score.

== Early life ==
Leonard-Morgan's mother was a music teacher. As a child, he learned to play the piano, violin, and recorder. He studied at the Royal Scottish Academy of Music and Drama, graduating in 1995 with a BA in musical studies.

== Career ==
Leonard-Morgan's first album, Filmtales, was released in 2007. Between 2006 and 2011, he wrote scores for the BBC spy drama Spooks. In 2007, he worked on the documentary J.K. Rowling: A Year in the Life, providing the backing music that went with the film that showed the author working on Harry Potter and the Deathly Hallows.

In 2008, he was chosen by the U.S. Olympic Committee to compose a new U.S. Olympic Team anthem. In the same year, he also wrote the music for Neil Oliver's BBC television series A History of Scotland. His score was performed by the BBC Scottish Symphony Orchestra in 2009.

In 2011, Leonard-Morgan composed the soundtrack for the sci-fi thriller Limitless, and he also wrote music for the television series based on the film. In 2012, he scored the sci-fi film Dredd, for which he was shortlisted at the 2013 World Soundtrack Public Choice Award. Also in 2012, Leonard-Morgan composed the queue music for Test Track at Epcot.

Leonard-Morgan first became involved with video game soundtracks by composing material for Battlefield Hardline, which was released in March 2015. In May 2016, a trailer for Warhammer 40,000: Dawn of War III was released, which included his composition; the game came out in 2017, with a score by Leonard-Morgan.

Leonard-Morgan cowrote the score for the 2020 video game Cyberpunk 2077. In an interview with Headliner Magazine on creating the score and soundtrack for the game, he said, "Writing dark music is relatively easy. Writing dark music like nobody else has ever written before is a little bit harder". Since 2025, he has been the composer for the CBS series Watson.

== Awards and honours ==
- Scottish BAFTA – Best Composer or Original Sound Design, for Reflections upon the Origin of the Pineapple (2000).
- BAFTA Nomination for Fallen (2004)
- Ivor Novello Awards Nomination for Fallen (2004)
- World Soundtrack Awards Nomination – Discovery of the Year, for Limitless (2011)
- Primetime Emmy Award Nomination – Outstanding Music Composition for a Series (Original Dramatic Score), for Limitless (2016)

== Selected discography ==
=== Film ===
| Year | Title | Director(s) | Studio |
|---|---|---|---|
| 2007 | Popcorn | Darren Paul Fisher | Moviehouse Entertainment |
| 2011 | Limitless | Neil Burger | Relativity Media |
| 2012 | Dredd | Pete Travis | Lionsgate |
| 2013 | The Numbers Station | Kasper Barfoed | Image Entertainment |
| 2013 | Walking with Dinosaurs | Neil Nightingale; Barry Cook | 20th Century Fox |
| 2014 | Legendary | Eric Styles | |
| 2016 | Amateurs in Space | Max Kestner | One Filmverleih |
| 2016 | The B-Side: Elsa Dorfman's Portrait Photography | Errol Morris | |
| 2017 | Accidental Anarchist | John Archer; Clara Glynn | TVF International |
| 2018 | American Dharma | Errol Morris | Utopia |
| 2019 | The Tomorrow Man | Noble Jones | Bleecker Street |
| 2019 | Last Breath | Richard da Costa; Alex Parkinson | Dogwoof |
| 2021 | Best Sellers | Lina Roessler | Screen Media |
| 2022 | Gigi & Nate | Nick Hamm | Roadside Attractions |
| 2023 | Boston Strangler | Matt Ruskin | 20th Century Studios |
| 2023 | The Pigeon Tunnel | Errol Morris | Apple TV+ |
| 2024 | Separated | Errol Morris | MSNBC Films |
| 2025 | Inheritance | Neil Burger | IFC Films |
| 2025 | Last Breath | Alex Parkinson | Focus Features |
| 2025 | Charlie Harper | Mac Eldridge; Tom Dean | Row K Entertainment |
| 2026 | Pretty Lethal | Vicky Jewson | Amazon MGM Studios |

=== Television ===
| Year | Title | Studio | Notes |
|---|---|---|---|
| 2004–2005 | The Brief | ITV | Composed with John E. Keane |
| 2006 | Galápagos | BBC Two | Documentary TV series |
| 2006–2011 | Spooks | BBC One | |
| 2008 | A History of Scotland | BBC One | TV series documentary |
| 2012 | How to Grow a Planet | BBC Two | TV series documentary |
| 2012 | Falcón | Sky Atlantic | TV miniseries |
| 2012–2016 | Murder | BBC Two | TV miniseries |
| 2015–2016 | Limitless | CBS | |
| 2017 | Wormwood | Netflix | TV docudrama miniseries |
| 2017–2022 | Dynasty | The CW | Theme music composed with Bill Conti and Troy Nõka |
| 2016–present | The Grand Tour | Amazon Studios | |
| 2019 | Designated Survivor | Netflix | Composed for season 3 |
| 2020 | Tales from the Loop | Amazon Studios | Composed with Philip Glass |
| 2020 | The Nest | BBC One | |
| 2021 | Myth & Mogul: John DeLorean | Netflix | TV docudrama miniseries |
| 2023 | Fellow Travelers | Showtime | TV miniseries |
| 2025 | Watson | CBS | |

=== Video games ===
| Year | Title | Studio | Notes |
|---|---|---|---|
| 2015 | Battlefield Hardline | Visceral Games | |
| 2017 | Warhammer 40,000: Dawn of War III | Relic Entertainment | |
| 2020 | Cyberpunk 2077 | CD Projekt Red | Composed with Marcin Przybyłowicz and P. T. Adamczyk |

=== Solo ===
| Year | Title | Notes |
|---|---|---|
| 2007 | Filmtales | Studio album |
