= A History of Scotland =

British television documentary series (2008–2009)

- First episode titlecard
- Genre: History
- Presented by: Neil Oliver
- Narrated by: Neil Oliver
- Composer: Paul Leonard-Morgan
- Country of origin: United Kingdom
- Original language: English
- No. of series: 2
- No. of episodes: 10

Production
- Cinematography: Neville Kidd
- Running time: 60 minutes

Original release
- Network: BBC One
- Release: November 2008 – November 2009

Presented by Neil Oliver, A History of Scotland is a television series first broadcast in November 2008 on BBC One Scotland and later shown UK-wide on BBC Two during January 2009. The second series began on BBC One Scotland in early November 2009, with transmission at a later point on network BBC Two. In Australia, series one aired on SBS One Sundays at 7:30 p.m., from 6 December 2009 to 3 January 2010. Series two commenced on 24 October 2010 running until 21 November 2010.

Along with the series, BBC Scotland planned a range of: radio programs, a new website, an interactive game and concerts. The Open University, in collaboration with the BBC, also created a series of audio walks around historic locations in Scotland, with narration from Oliver.

== Episodes ==
Episodes are 60 minutes in length, with the following information sourced from the BBC website.

=== Series 1 ===
Episode	Title	Airdate
1	The Last of the Free	9 November 2008
At the dawn of the first millennium, there was no Scotland or England. In the first episode, Oliver reveals the mystery of how the Gaelic Scottish Kingdom – Alba – was born, and why its role in one of the greatest battles ever fought on British soil defined the shape of Great Britain in the modern era.
2	Hammers of the Scots	16 November 2008
Oliver charts the 13th century story of the two men who helped transform the Gaelic kingdom of Alba into the Scotland of today. While Alexander II forged Scotland in blood and violence, William Wallace's resistance to King Edward I of England hammered national consciousness into the Scots.
3	Bishop Makes King	24 November 2008
Robert Bruce's 22-year struggle to secure the Scots' independence is one of the most important chapters in Scotland's story. Oliver explores the role the Scottish church played in promoting Robert Bruce, the propaganda campaigns, both at home and abroad, and how the 1320 Declaration of Arbroath persuaded the Pope to, finally, recognise Scotland as an independent nation.
4	Language Is Power	1 December 2008
At one time, Gaelic Scotland – the people and the language – was central to the identity of Scots. But, as Oliver reveals, Scotland's infamous Highland/Lowland divide was the result of a family struggle that divided the kingdom. This is the story of how the policies of the Stewart royal family in the 15th century led to the Gaels being perceived as rebels and outsiders.
5	Project Britain	8 December 2008
Oliver describes how the ambitions of two of Scotland's Stuart monarchs were the driving force that united two ancient enemies, and set them on the road to the Great Britain we know today. While Mary Queen of Scots plotted to usurp Elizabeth I and seize the throne of England, her son James' dreamt of a more radical future: a Protestant Great Britain.

=== Series 2 ===
Episode	Title	Airdate
1	God's Chosen People	24 November 2009
Neil Oliver continues his journey through Scotland's past with the story of the Covenanters, whose profound religious beliefs were declared in the National Covenant of 1638. This document licensed revolution, started the Civil War that cost King Charles I his head, cost tens of thousands of Scots their lives and led to Britain's first war on terror.
2	Let's Pretend	1 December 2009
Bitterly divided by politics and religion for centuries, this is the infamous story of how Scotland and England came together in 1707 to form Great Britain. Over time, the Union matured into one of the longest in European history, but it very nearly ended in divorce. Exploiting the Union's unpopularity, the exiled Stuarts staged several comebacks, selling themselves as a credible and liberal alternative to the Hanoverian regime. Neil Oliver reveals just how close they came to succeeding.
3	The Price of Progress	8 December 2009
Through the winning and losing of an American empire and the impact of the Scottish Enlightenment, Neil Oliver reveals how in the second half of the 18th century Scotland was transformed from a poor northern backwater, with a serious image problem, into one of the richest nations on Earth. This was the dawn of the modern age when Scotland made its mark on the world, by exporting its most valuable commodities – its people and ideas.
4	This Land Is Our Land	15 December 2009
At the start of the 19th century, everything familiar was swept away. People fled from the countryside into the industrial towns of Scotland's Central Belt. Rural workers became factory workers – in some of the worst conditions in Europe. This new Scotland became a seedbed of revolution. But, it wasn't just force that kept the Scottish people in their place, it was fantasy. Neil Oliver reveals how Sir Walter Scott created so powerful a myth, it haunts the Scots collective imagination to this day.
5	Project Scotland	19 December 2009
As a partner in the British Empire, Scotland began the 20th century with an advanced economy and a world-beating heavy industry. But, in the closing decades, its sense of Britishness was in doubt and a Scottish Parliament sat in Edinburgh for the first time since 1707. Charting Scotland's darkest century, Neil Oliver discovers a country driven to self-determination through a series of economic crises so deep, that her most striking export became her own disillusioned population.

== Reception ==
Despite being hailed by BBC Scotland as "one of its most ambitious projects ever", the show has not been without controversy. There have been some claims, on the website of the BBC, that the programme made some errors. Further, the 10-part series has come under fire over claims that it is too "anglocentric".
