= Limitless (TV series) =

2015 American comedy-drama television series

- Genre: Science fiction; Comedy drama; Thriller
- Based on: The Dark Fields by Alan Glynn; Limitless by Leslie Dixon
- Developed by: Craig Sweeny
- Starring: Jake McDorman; Jennifer Carpenter; Hill Harper; Mary Elizabeth Mastrantonio
- Composer: Paul Leonard-Morgan
- Country of origin: United States
- Original language: English
- No. of seasons: 1
- No. of episodes: 22

Production
- Executive producers: Bradley Cooper; Todd Phillips; Ryan Kavanaugh; Tucker Tooley; Tom Forman; Heather Kadin; Marc Webb; Craig Sweeny; Alex Kurtzman; Roberto Orci
- Production location: New York City
- Camera setup: Single-camera
- Running time: 43–45 minutes
- Production companies: K/O Paper Products; Relativity Television (episodes 1–12); Action This Day!; Critical Content (episodes 13–22); CBS Television Studios

Original release
- Network: CBS
- Release: September 22, 2015 – April 26, 2016

Limitless is an American comedy-drama television series that aired on CBS for one season from 2015 to 2016. It is a continuation of the 2011 film of the same name, and takes place four years after the film's events. The series stars Jake McDorman as Brian Finch, who samples a mysterious nootropic drug, which unlocks the full potential of the human brain and gives its user enhanced mental faculties.

Limitless premiered on CBS on September 22, 2015 to mixed reviews from critics. After a single 22-episode season that ended on April 26, 2016, showrunner Craig Sweeny announced that CBS had cancelled the series.

== Premise ==
Brian Finch, a 28-year-old burnout and struggling musician, is introduced to NZT-48, a miracle drug that gives him access to every neuron in his brain. For twelve hours after taking the pill, he becomes the smartest person in the world, able to perfectly recall every detail of his life and capable of prodigious leaps of intuition and reasoning. With the mysterious US Senator Eddie Morra providing him with an immunity shot to counteract NZT's deadly side effects, Brian uses his enhanced abilities to help FBI Special Agent Rebecca Harris. The FBI does not know about the shot and Brian has to struggle to keep both worlds separate.

== Cast and characters ==
=== Main ===
- Jake McDorman as Brian Finch
- Jennifer Carpenter as FBI Special Agent Rebecca Harris
- Hill Harper as FBI Special Agent Spelman Boyle, named for Spelman College.
- Mary Elizabeth Mastrantonio as FBI Special Agent-in-Charge Nasreen "Naz" Pouran, of Iranian origin, commander of the Cross Jurisdictional Command (CJC) team

=== Recurring ===
- Bradley Cooper as U.S. Senator Edward "Eddie" Morra, the original protagonist from the 2011 film
- Lio Tipton (Note: Credited as Analeigh Tipton; Tipton came out as non-binary and changed their name in 2021.) as Shauna, Brian's ex-girlfriend
- Ron Rifkin as Dennis Finch, Brian's father
- Blair Brown as Marie Finch, Brian's mother
- Megan Guinan as Rachel Finch, Brian's sister
- Tom Degnan as FBI Agent Jason "Ike", Mike's partner and one of Brian's bodyguards
- Michael James Shaw as FBI Agent Daryl "Mike", Ike's partner and one of Brian's bodyguards
- Colin Salmon as Jarrod Sands, a former MI6 officer who now works as a fixer for Morra
- Desmond Harrington as SWAT Agent Casey Rooks
- Georgina Haig as Piper Baird
- Michael Devine as James "Tech" Padgett
- Henry Gagliardi as young Brian Finch

== Episodes ==
No.	Title	Directed by	Written by	Original release date	U.S. viewers (millions)
1	"Pilot"	Marc Webb	Craig Sweeny	September 22, 2015	9.86
When his father becomes seriously ill, Brian Finch realises he has not reached the goals that he had set for his life. His friend Eli offers him a pill of NZT, which helps Brian excel in his temp job and discover the true nature of his father's disease. When Brian finds Eli dead from a gunshot, he becomes the main suspect in an FBI murder investigation. Looking for more NZT, Brian tracks down one of Eli's coworkers and gets shot in the leg by the real murderer. He passes out, and awakes to find himself with Senator Eddie Morra, who offers him access to both NZT and a drug to counter its dangerous side effects, on the condition that he will not tell the FBI. The FBI wants to find out who created NZT and how to counter the side effects, and FBI agent Rebecca Harris offers Brian a consultant position with the Bureau. Brian insists that they first help his father get an immediate liver transplant. Agent Harris reveals a personal reason behind her involvement in the investigation: she suspects that her father was using NZT before he was found dead in a river.
2	"Badge! Gun!"	Marc Webb	Craig Sweeny & Marc Webb	September 29, 2015	9.73
Brian begins work with the FBI, only to be stuck behind a desk as an analyst while they monitor his use of NZT, since they are unaware he is using the enzyme to counter the side effects. Restless, he works his way into an assassination case investigated by Harris and Boyle, but leaves the facility against orders to find evidence, and nearly gets himself fired. Together they unravel a plot to target an army general with a genetically-engineered virus. Meanwhile, Brian tries to learn more about Senator Eddie Morra but fails, as every time he tries to search for Eddie Morra and NZT together, his device mysteriously shuts down. Morra's nurse starts taking care of Brian's father in order to monitor Brian.
3	"The Legend of Marco Ramos"	Guillermo Navarro	Matthew Federman & Stephen Scaia	October 6, 2015	9.57
With his daily NZT pill, Brian helps the FBI find a sniper who shot a former FBI agent. He also has a chance encounter with Shauna, a former love interest, and starts a new relationship with her. One of Morra's henchmen, Mr. Sands, calls himself Brian's new boss and threatens to harm Brian's friends and family if Brian does not comply with his every request on behalf of Morra's interests. To protect Shauna, Brian breaks up with her.
4	"Page 44"	Doug Aarniokoski	Mark Goffman	October 13, 2015	8.03
Brian receives his first confidential case, investigating a Chinese spy. However, when his new online friend Arthur Maciel is framed for the murder of a former business partner, Rebecca helps Brian look into the police investigation instead. Mr. Sands asks Brian to find out how much the FBI knows about NZT and threatens to withhold the counter-effect drug until he has their files. Afraid of committing treason and not wanting to betray Rebecca, Brian fabricates a file. However, this does not fool Sands, and he has Brian's father infected with a virus to force Brian to steal the real files. After her father's old friend urges Rebecca to visit an exhibition of her father's last paintings and receiving advice from Brian, she goes, only to realize that he painted her portrait. Brian finds her father in the FBI NZT files.
5	"Personality Crisis"	Joshua Butler	Sallie Patrick	October 20, 2015	7.90
After recovering all of the files the FBI has on NZT, which includes information about suspected users past and present, one of whom being Rebecca's late father, Brian very badly wants to tell her, but worries that it will blow his cover. He convinces himself to not tell her by making videos from his NZT self to his non-NZT self. The CJC brings Brian in on a case to investigate a ring of meth labs, only for them to find a much bigger plot of a planned terrorist attack on New York. During this, he gets punched by Chris Garper, whose older brother, Sam, is involved with the plot. Brian also accidentally meddles in Rebecca's personal life while learning self-defense from her secret boyfriend, FBI and SWAT agent Casey Rooks (who incidentally does not know about NZT), and makes him suspicious about how Brian was able to pick up self-defense technique so quickly. Chris reluctantly begins to trust Brian, and eventually agrees to bring in Sam at the promise of a lighter sentence for him, but during the confrontation Chris tries to intervene and dies. Brian ignores his NZT self's advice and tells Rebecca about her father. He also makes a video from his non-NZT self to his NZT self justifying his actions.
6	"Side Effects May Include..."	Doug Aarniokoski	Jenna Richman	October 27, 2015	7.45
After Brian finally tells Rebecca about the file, they start digging deeper into her father's involvement with NZT and become suspicious of Naz. Sands, however, wants Rebecca gone and attempts to blackmail Brian into framing her by withholding the immunity shot he needs to resist the side effects of NZT. Rebecca gets selected to participate in an inter-agency wargame by Naz to counteract a hypothetical cyberattack on the economy, which is considered an honor and a way to jumpstart her career in the FBI. Brian hopes that whoever created NZT might be able to provide him with a way to counteract the side effects, and eventually tracks down Andrew Epperly, a supposedly dead Ubient scientist who received the NZT formula anonymously, and tried it on his own father who was suffering from Alzheimer's, as well as on several others, including Rebecca's father. Rebecca stands out in the wargame meetings for her quick thinking and creativity in coming up with countermeasures, and lands a prestigious meeting with Director Avery, the head of the FBI. She skips out on the meeting and, at Brian's request, as he is incapacitated by the worsening side effects of NZT, confronts Epperly who he reveals he faked his death after NZT started circulating on the streets. Afterwards, Naz admonishes Rebecca for skipping out on the meeting and tells her she knows Rebecca knows about her father's file and explains her own motives. She also gives Rebecca a second chance at the meeting with the FBI director by taking the blame herself and telling him it was a misunderstanding on her part. Finally, Morra gives Brian the shot and five extra NZT pills. He explains he was testing his moral compass to determine whether he is "somebody who just takes orders like Sands, or if he is somebody who has character".
7	"Brian Finch's Black Op"	Aaron Lipstadt	Taylor Elmore	November 3, 2015	7.86
Brian fakes being sick when Mike & Ike show up for his morning NZT pill in order to create his own version of Ferris Bueller's Day Off with one of the five NZT pills Senator Morra gave him. However, the CIA abducts him before he is even able to leave his apartment to borrow his NZT-enhanced capabilities for a black-ops mission without Naz's clearance nor knowledge, infuriating her and forcing the CIA agent handling the case to return Brian. It becomes clear near the end of the mission that Brian will most likely be killed by the CIA mercenaries who kidnapped him, as the mission has gone off-script. Brian thinks quickly on his feet to get out alive, even with his NZT dose wearing off, and finally manages to escape, although all of the CIA agents with him either flee or die in front of him.
8	"When Pirates Pirate Pirates"	Peter Werner	Kari Drake	November 10, 2015	7.09
Naz is taken into custody because she is under suspicion of funding a group of international terrorists. She paid a known terrorist to help with the release of her niece from Southeast Asian pirates. This brings the whole NZT program at the FBI to a halt and Brian briefly retreats to Naz's home (his new safe house). Together with Naz's daughter, Ava, he plans to find a solution using a pill from his stash, which he reluctantly reveals to Rebecca. Boyle digs around to see who turned in Naz, and exposes another agent, Agent Paulson. Brian, Rebecca, and Ava negotiate with the pirates by gifting a rare pinball machine to their old captain in exchange for Naz's niece's release, and after convincing Sands to help, they all get Naz out of detention and reinstate her back into her position. Brian and Ava express interest in each other, and Naz says she "could do worse".
9	"Headquarters!"	Doug Aarniokoski	Story by : Frances Brennand Roper; Teleplay by : Craig Sweeny	November 17, 2015	7.52
Brian begs Naz for his own office which he calls his "headquarters!" To earn it, he sends agents out to track down criminals on the FBI's top Ten Most Wanted list, but when this endeavor starts to attract too much attention, Naz shuts down the search. Meanwhile, he realizes one of the criminals on the list is innocent and helps to find the real killer. Brian meets with his father, who feels they have become increasingly estranged, so Brian tells him about NZT.
10	"Arm-ageddon"	Leslie Libman	Dennis Saavedra Saldua	November 24, 2015	6.53
Brian is asked by Agent Boyle to help his U.S. Ranger friend whose brain-controlled prosthetic arm appears to have killed his wife against his will. He finds that multiple other people's prosthetic arms have malfunctioned due to someone hacking them, but it turned out Boyle's friend knew about this ahead of time and used this as cover to murder his wife. Meanwhile, Brian's father wants him out of the FBI and betrays his confidence to a lawyer friend in order to start a case against the FBI. After Brian convinces him to stand down, he confronts Naz and tells her that he will not sue her, but warns that if something should happen to Brian, he will.
11	"This is Your Brian on Drugs"	Steven A. Adelson	Sallie Patrick	December 15, 2015	6.70
Mike and Ike express their dissatisfaction with how Brian takes them for granted. During a robbery at the pharmacy where they pick up Brian's NZT pills each day, Ike gets shot. Rebecca faces relationship issues with Casey, and struggles to find a way to break up with him. The FBI and Brian find the stolen NZT pills, but during transit, a member of Casey's team take them for themself, triggering an internal investigation. At first, Casey is hesitant to try the drug and tells his team to find a way to return them, as Rebecca's job is on the line, but after Rebecca breaks up with him over text, he and the rest of his team end up taking the drug. On NZT, one of his team members murders another after realizing he slept with his wife, and Casey tries to help cover it up. However, Brian realizes they are on NZT and tells Rebecca, who gets the word out and makes the building go into lockdown. Casey and the remaining members of his team take them both hostage, and Brian begins to help them attempt to escape the building in order to prevent further harm. The situation escalates when Boyle, warned ahead of time by Brian, comes to rescue them. Casey holds Brian at gunpoint, but Boyle shoots him in the head before Casey could kill Brian, despite Brian's insistence that he could handle it. Afterwards, he tells Boyle that Casey had time to shoot Brian after Boyle pulled the trigger, but instead lowered his gun. When Ike wakes up, Brian begins to call both Mike and Ike by their real names, Daryl and Jason, respectively.
12	"The Assassination of Eddie Morra"	Christine Moore	Matthew Federman & Stephen Scaia	January 5, 2016	7.30
Senator Edward Morra is target of an assassination attempt while giving a speech at the Intrepid Sea, Air & Space Museum in Manhattan. Sands informs Brian that a woman named Piper Baird is behind the failed attempt on the senator's life. Piper is a former associate of Morra's, who was involved in the development of the immunity shot. She began questioning the senator's motives and went rogue, breaking into one of his R&D facilities and stealing a year's supply of the enzyme. Upon finding Piper, Brian has doubts about the intentions of Morra and Sands. Eventually, he helps her fake her death so that she can go into hiding. Towards the end of the episode, the senator announces his candidacy for the presidency of the United States.
13	"Stop Me Before I Hug Again"	Edward Ornelas	Jenna Richman	January 19, 2016	6.33
Brian needs to find a serial killer. In the process, he finds out an innocent man is in jail, convicted of a series of murders. Brian sets out to prove the man's innocence and catch the real killer. Meanwhile, Brian realizes that Morra's coat from the assassination attempt, on which is Morra's blood, is still in the evidence locker and if tested, Morra will be exposed as an NZT user. After informing Sands, he brings in another coat with Morra's blood without NZT inside it and manages to fool the evidence clerk into letting him in, where he covertly switches the coat just as Rebecca, who is investigating Morra, goes in to retrieve the coat.
14	"Fundamentals of Naked Portraiture"	Guy Ferland	Story by : Dennis Saavedra Saldua & Craig Sweeny; Teleplay by : Sallie Patrick & Craig Sweeny	February 9, 2016	6.39
Brian gets a new bodyguard, Spike—who rubs Ike the wrong way. The FBI investigates the death of a programmer who was working on a type of artificial intelligence and who may have been selling secrets to the enemy. Rebecca asks Finch to go along with her and Boyle to the evidence locker but Brian is hesitant as the clerk will recognize him. However, just before they are about to make the trip, they hear that the evidence clerk has suddenly died from eating food laced with peanuts (to which he was allergic).
15	"Undercover!"	Peter Werner	Taylor Elmore	February 16, 2016	6.01
Following the theft of the FBI's list of undercover agents, Finch goes undercover with one of them who does not want to come in due to being very close to catching the human traffickers she has been investigating, until she grows romantic feelings for him due to his help. Elsewhere, Brian meets with Sands, who admits that he murdered the evidence clerk in order to prevent Brian from being exposed, but Brian argues that Rebecca is now even more suspicious of the circumstances. Sands decides to meet with Rebecca and offers her a job within Morra's organization, but she declines.
16	"Sands, Agent of Morra"	Rich Lee	Gregory Weidman & Geoff Tock	February 23, 2016	5.87
Brian is visited by his sister, Rachel, for hanging out. However, Brian is suddenly visited by Sands, who is injured. After stitching him up, he swears Rachel to secrecy and goes with Sands to help him out, who is being forced to murder his former army colleagues because he needs to save his son. Coincidentally, Rebecca and Boyle are on a case where a boy of a wealthy political family has been kidnapped, who just happens to be Sands' son. Elsewhere, Rachel has to cover up for Brian when Ike checks up, but she ends up sleeping with him.
17	"Close Encounters"	Maja Vrvilo	Kari Drake	March 8, 2016	5.40
Amidst a large-scale blackout in Manhattan, Brian tracks down whoever stole an estimated $8 million in cash from the mutilated money vault. Meanwhile, Mike and Ike hear Brian's mother blurt out that there was an injured agent lying in his apartment. To make matters worse, Brian is confronted by his mother about NZT after Rachel produces his spare NZT pills, and she ostracizes him from the family after his father, who is also his attorney, refuses to tell her more after his NZT pills are confiscated. Brian, who covertly steals the pills back, decides to leave and leaves Rebecca an apology note.
18	"Bezgranichnyy"	John Behring	Matthew Federman & Stephen Scaia	March 15, 2016	5.63
Brian, wanting to finally rid himself of Morra's influence on him, travels to St. Petersburg, Russia, where he reconnects with Piper and helps her steal the last ingredient she needs to synthesize the enzyme that protects against NZT damage, from the highly secured vault of an eco-friendly Russian millionaire. Meanwhile, Naz launches a search for Brian after finding out that he stole some spare NZT pills. The title of this episode is Russian for "limitless".
19	"A Dog's Breakfast"	Lexi Alexander	Jenna Richman	March 22, 2016	6.64
Returning from Russia, Brian is placed under increased surveillance by both the FBI and by Sands, while Rebecca, with help from Mike and Ike, starts her own investigation about Brian's meetings with Sands. He solves the case of a man who was murdered and had his kidney stolen. Sands gets to Piper before Brian can and acquires her supply of the enzyme while forcing her to make NZT. Brian comes clean about Piper to Senator Morra, who tells him that Sands has gone AWOL. Meanwhile, after witnessing Brian's visit to Morra, Rebecca goes to his house with handcuffs and demands that Brian explain his connection with Morra.
20	"Hi, My Name Is Rebecca Harris"	Holly Dale	Mark Goffman	April 5, 2016	6.07
When Rebecca confronts Brian about his lies, he admits everything to her about spying for Morra and that Sands killed her father. She then takes his NZT pill for that day and they find Huston's burn book that Brian hid with the information about the NZT purge. This leads them to a former Morra employee who was addicted to NZT and she gives them a cigarette butt with the DNA of the killer. As they leave her trailer, Harris is shot by a sniper sent by Sands to kill them and Brian purforms field surgery to help her. They then go visit Huston and attempt to communicate with him in his coma using a homemade EEG machine. With the information gathered, they lure out Sands and arrest him.
21	"Finale: Part One!"	Paul Edwards	Sallie Patrick & Taylor Elmore	April 19, 2016	5.63
When NZT floods the streets of New York City and threatens to become a national epidemic, the FBI partners with the DEA in a city-wide manhunt to find the lab producing the drug. Also, Brian has trouble adjusting to his new reality when he lacks the resources to continue searching for Piper.
22	"Finale: Part Two!!"	Douglas Aarniokoski	Craig Sweeny & Taylor Elmore	April 26, 2016	5.71
Sands enacts a plan regarding Canada's Northwest Passage, as Boyle and Harris fail to save the diplomat Sands orders assassinated. Using details taken from the killer's testimony, Brian and the CJC close in on Sands' real NZT lab. When the lab is raided, Brian learns Piper was there but is gone, while Sands is shot by Rebecca and sent to the hospital. After Brian returns to his parents' house, he learns Piper is there with a permanent NZT immunity shot, but that she has to keep moving so the cure does not fall into the wrong hands. Brian returns to the CJC with his own squad to tackle new cases, while Senator Morra is still missing.

== Production ==
=== Development ===
On October 31, 2014, it was announced that actor Bradley Cooper had decided to develop a television series based on a movie, and had teamed with Alex Kurtzman and Roberto Orci to develop the concept. CBS Television Studios was shopping the show to the American broadcast networks. Craig Sweeny would write the series, while Cooper would serve as executive producer. CBS ordered a pilot on January 28, 2015. In addition to Cooper, Kurtzman, Orci, and Sweeny served as executive producers for the series, which is set 4 years after the original film. On February 3, 2015, it was announced that Marc Webb would direct the pilot.

=== Casting ===
On February 26, 2015, it was announced that Jake McDorman had joined the production as Brian Finch. Several additional cast members were announced in March 2015. Jennifer Carpenter plays FBI Special Agent Rebecca Harris. Hill Harper is FBI Special Agent Spelman Boyle. Finally, Mary Elizabeth Mastrantonio is FBI Special Agent-in-Charge Nasreen "Naz" Pouran, of Iranian origin commander of the Cross Jurisdictional Command (CJC) team.

== Broadcast ==
The premiere of Limitless was broadcast in the U.S. on CBS on September 22, 2015. In Canada, the show was simulcast with the American broadcast, which was aired on Global. In Brazil, the TV station Space aired the series on October 1, 2015. The series premiered in Australia on Network Ten on October 11, 2015. In Italy, the series aired on January 3, 2016 on Rai 2. In the United Kingdom and Ireland, the series aired on February 17, 2016 on Sky One.

== Reception ==
Limitless received mixed reviews from critics. The review aggregator website Rotten Tomatoes reports a 58% approval rating with an average rating of 6.4/10 based on 48 reviews. The website's critics' consensus reads, "Even with a likable hero, Limitless cannot overcome its credulity-straining premise and shaky, hole-riddled narrative." On Metacritic, the series holds an average score of 57 out of 100 based on 30 critics.

=== Ratings ===
Viewership and ratings per episode of Limitless
No.	Title	Air date	Rating/share (18–49)	Viewers (millions)	DVR (18–49)	DVR viewers (millions)	Total (18–49)	Total viewers (millions)
1	"Pilot"	September 22, 2015	1.9/6	9.86	1.3	4.40	3.2	14.26
2	"Badge! Gun!"	September 29, 2015	1.9/7	9.73	1.2	4.10	3.1	13.84
3	"The Legend of Marcos Ramos"	October 6, 2015	1.7/6	9.57	1.1	3.53	2.8	13.11
4	"Page 44"	October 13, 2015	1.4/5	8.03	1.2	3.64	2.6	11.67
5	"Personality Crisis"	October 20, 2015	1.4/4	7.90	1.2	3.63	2.6	11.53
6	"Side Effects May Include..."	October 27, 2015	1.4/4	7.45	1.1	3.41	2.5	10.86
7	"Brian Finch's Black Op"	November 3, 2015	1.5/5	7.86	1.1	3.27	2.6	11.13
8	"When Pirates Pirate Pirates"	November 10, 2015	1.5/5	7.09	1.0	3.20	2.5	10.30
9	"Headquarters!"	November 17, 2015	1.4/5	7.52	1.1	3.54	2.5	11.07
10	"Arm-ageddon"	November 24, 2015	1.3/4	6.53	0.9	3.15	2.2	9.68
11	"This is Your Brian on Drugs"	December 15, 2015	1.3/4	6.63	1.0	3.39	2.3	10.02
12	"The Assassination of Eddie Morra"	January 5, 2016	1.4/5	7.40	0.9	2.83	2.3	10.13
13	"Stop Me Before I Hug Again"	January 19, 2016	1.2/4	6.33	1.2	3.50	2.4	9.83
14	"Fundamentals of Naked Portraiture"	February 9, 2016	1.3/4	6.39	1.0	3.19	2.3	9.57
15	"Undercover!"	February 16, 2016	1.2/4	6.01	1.0	3.05	2.2	9.06
16	"Sands, Agent of Morra"	February 23, 2016	1.1/4	5.87	1.0	2.93	2.1	8.79
17	"Close Encounters"	March 8, 2016	1.1/4	5.40	1.0	3.05	2.1	8.45
18	"Bezgranichnyy"	March 15, 2016	1.1/4	5.63	0.8	2.70	1.9	8.33
19	"A Dog's Breakfast"	March 22, 2016	1.3/5	6.64	0.9	2.81	2.2	9.46
20	"Hi, My Name is Rebecca Harris..."	April 5, 2016	1.1/4	6.07	0.9	2.74	2.0	8.81
21	"Finale: Part One!"	April 19, 2016	1.1/4	5.63	0.8	2.49	1.9	8.12
22	"Finale: Part Two!!"	April 26, 2016	1.1/4	5.71	0.8	2.52	1.9	7.99
