= Sacred Wonders of Britain =

British television documentary series (2013–2014)

- Genre: Factual
- Presented by: Neil Oliver
- Country of origin: United Kingdom
- Original language: English
- No. of series: 1
- No. of episodes: 3 (list of episodes)

Production
- Running time: 60 minutes

Original release
- Network: BBC Two; BBC Two HD
- Release: 30 December 2013 – 13 January 2014

Sacred Wonders of Britain is a British television documentary series that was first broadcast on BBC Two on 30 December 2013. The three-part series was presented by Neil Oliver. Computer-generated imagery was produced by Carbon Digital at MediaCityUK for the series, including the title sequence.

== Episode list ==
No.	Title	Directed by	Original release date	UK viewers (millions)
1	"Episode 1"	Martin Kemp	30 December 2013	2.58
2	"Episode 2"	Jonathan Barker	6 January 2014	1.99
3	"Episode 3"	Graham Johnston	13 January 2014	1.56

== Reception ==
=== Ratings ===
According to overnight figures, the first episode had 2.36 million viewers with 9.79% of the audience share. The second and third episodes had audience shares of 7.3%.

=== Critical reception ===
Lucy Mangan of The Guardian said the programme was "equally unafraid to be informative and meditative, which made it rather wonderful". The Daily Mirror called it a "towering spectacle of non-information" and was unconvinced by the series.
