= Conflict archaeology =

Sub-discipline within archaeology

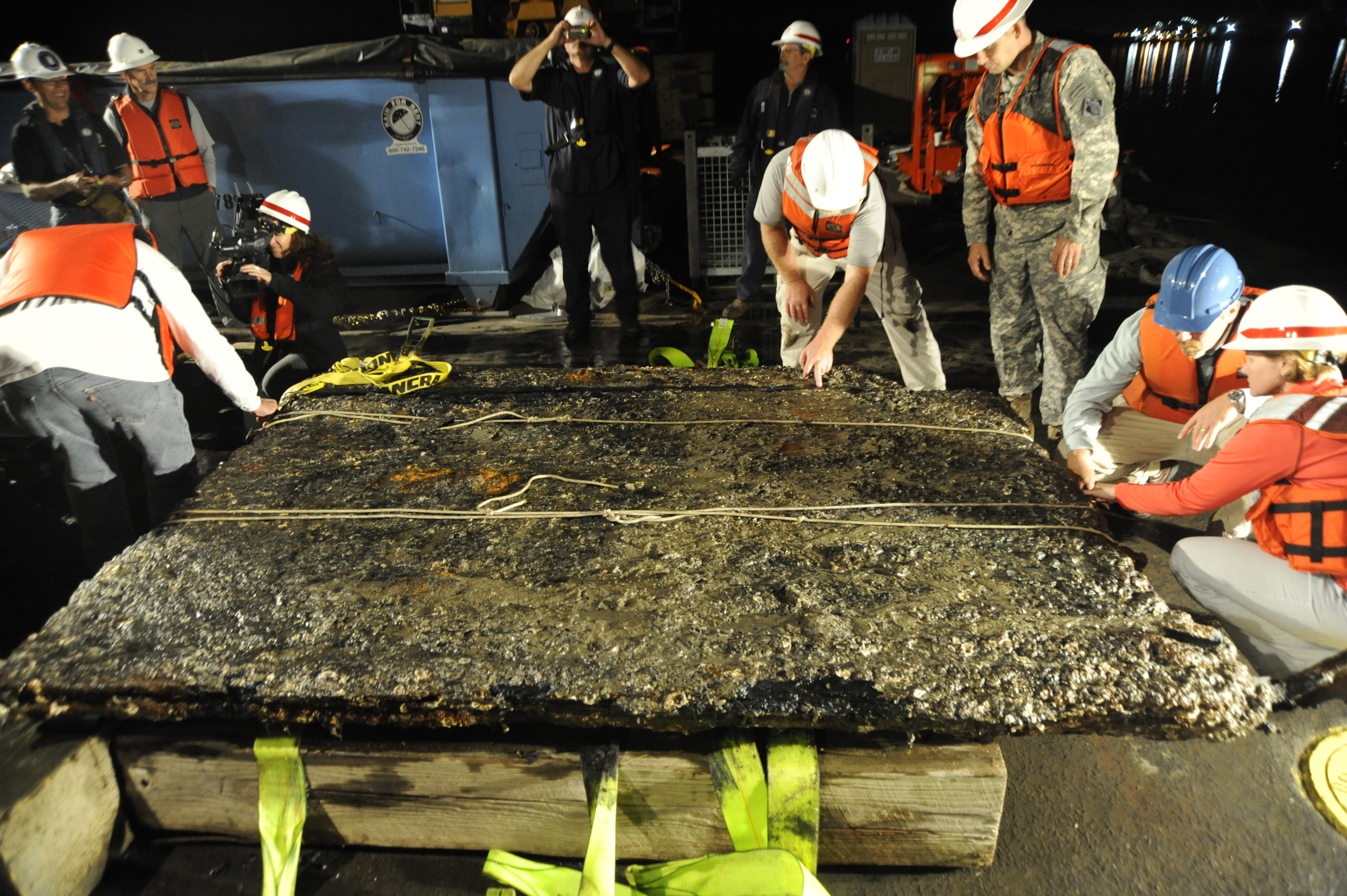
Archeologists working for the U.S. Army Corps of Engineers, Savannah District, aided by divers and salvage operations teams from the U.S. Navy, retrieve from the bottom of the Savannah River a section of a Confederate ironclad warship CSS Georgia scuttled in 1864 as Union troops approached Savannah.

Conflict archaeology is a sub-discipline within archaeology focused on intergroup and intragroup conflict. Closely linked to battlefield archaeology and Military Sites Archaeology, conflict archaeology is developing as an umbrella sub-discipline that encompasses these others, allowing for greater epistemological elasticity than other terms. Modern conflict archaeology deals with technological, social, cultural, psychological aspects of present conflicts. Unlike battlefield archaeology, modern conflict archaeology delves deeper into the anthropological study of the conflicts rather than the physical manifestations of the battles. As stated by Nicholas J. Saunders in his book Beyond the Dead Horizon, "These complexities are generated partly by nature of modern wars/conflicts of industrialized intensity and they incorporate political and nationalistic motivations and notions of ethnicity and identity."

In order to understand the modern-day conflict, it is important to recognize two fundamental issues:

1. Realize that each conflict is a multifaceted issue which incorporates many anthropological contexts of involved populations.

2. In order to understand the actual conflict, one must understand all facets of the motivating issues and their layers of conflict.

As stated by Saunders; "This multitude of issues makes modern conflict sites...multi-layered landscapes...that require robust interdisciplinary approaches."(Saunders, pg. x). Conflict archaeology addresses any type of issue regardless of size or effect, more importantly the residual effects felt from the conflict itself upon the surrounding populations. "In this view the constantly shifting multidimensional aftermaths of conflict are as important as the conflict themselves."

Conflict archaeology is most strongly followed by some historical archaeologists in the United States and archaeologists of all time periods in Europe. Significant studies of conflict in North America predating the arrival of Europeans have been done, but these works are largely situated within regional, not thematic literature.

== A Case Study: The Bare Bones; body parts and conflict behavior ==
Within Saunders work, Susannah Callow's paper is presented as she analyzes the role in which body parts of the deceased act as key indicators of complex narratives of individual experiences during a conflict (i.e. politics, social status, personal memento etc.) as stated by allowing, "...the body is central to human experiences of modern warfare...material and human destruction...becomes a way of living material form to discourse and the body in pain is a vital component in battle to assert meaning and authority."

Essentially our bodies act as physical manifestations of past conflicts. The physical effects that violence inflicts upon our bodies are allowed for the characterization of the surrounding conflict which was participated in. Our bodies tell us the human interaction enacted and the course of the conflict, whether one side was dominated in regards to another, based on physical evidence. As Callow states, "Permanent wounds such as scars or missing body parts convey messages about the success or failure of casing wounds to one another...and the military success of the individual who carries out such acts." A primary component is that of dehumanization. "Dehumanization is the psychological term describing a process of denying the humanity or human characteristic of an individual/subgroup" Dehumanization is evident via acts of mutilation and is often revealed by the manner in which the dead are killed. This psychological process leads to the lack of restraint and often incites the celebration of death. Therefore, this is often illustrated by mass killings, genocides, use and disuse of parts and body part artifact construction. There are two major components of the dehumanization perspective:

1. Body parts are equivalent to material culture This is expressed in the lynchings of the south in the late 18th century. These lynchings often featured a crowd which would take and sell body parts of the deceased. These actions, as Callow states, "...conferred the stakes of belonging to the 'correct' group"

2. Deceased Individuals are viewed as waste. For example, Nazi concentration camps often referred to the Jews as "loads or "merchandise" and resulted in the victims loss of identity. This is further emphasized as they were marked with numbers and herded like cattle. In the end disposal of their bodies were often mechanical oftentimes lacking proper post-mortem practices. Also, the deceased body parts were often used to create various commodities. For example, skulls were collected and sold for profit, skin was used to make leather and human fat was used to make soap. Therefore, it is through these examples that we realize that modern day conflicts are not limited to the battles and wars, but the psychological and anthropological interactions between various populations and the underlying motivations it exposes.

== Methods and theory ==
=== Origins ===
Over the last two decades conflict archaeology has developed from Historic archaeology to include multiple elements in the fields of anthropology and archaeology. Early efforts include 1842 surveys of the English Civil War site of Naseby, and in the twentieth century the 1950s examination of the Portuguese battle of Aljbarotta of AD1325. In the United States attention was drawn to the possibilities of conflict archaeology in the National Parks sites of Little Big Horn and selected Civil Battle fields. Much of the work done on these later sites was with metal detectors. Although this technology has received a less than warm welcome to field work due to its use in relic hunting, it has become a staple in many investigations. Relic hunting was around long before the metal detector was invented.

=== Field methodology ===
Since much of conflict archaeology has been from the historic period, documentary research remains a primary starting point for the process. Published documents, maps, chart, aerial photography all aid in getting preliminary starting point. Field work will then include pedestrian survey and possibly remote sensing, including not only metal detecting, but also magnetometry, Ground Penetrating Radar(GPR), Resistivity, and more recently, Light Detection and Ranging (LIDAR). This ability to sense what is beneath the surface often allows for the true location of structure. In conflict archaeology these are often fortifications such as trenches, breastworks as well as housing, transportation and storage areas.

Facilities away from the battlefield itself are also a concern of conflict archaeology. Other complexes such as supply, food preparation, sanitation, transportation, command structures, facilities for prisoners, hospitals and possibly the burial of the dead.

Structural elements and fortifications may be mobile or static, short term or long term, and may even have multiple occupations during protracted periods. Identification of these structures should reflect the cultural tendencies of a group in that period. Following that theme, the location through remote sensing and traditional test excavation may reveal elements of conflict at a more personal level. All of this may be used to observe first hand behavior of groups and individuals under the stress of battle.

=== Applications toward anthropology ===
Cultural patterns-One of the approaches to working in this area is to understand the nature of conflict of given cultures. Not all people fight the same way. By studying the cultural signature of opposing groups, insight may be gained to help interpret not only the battlefield, but also the areas involved in pre and post conflict activities.

Training is one of these areas. Again, not all people fight the same way given their individual histories, demographic makeup, as well as technical and natural resources. Also, people tend to fight the way they were trained, so that in examining an area of conflict similar patterns are likely to appear. The way the forces reconnoiter, approach, deploy and exit a conflict will often reflect a given group's training, hence these may be predicted, thereby locating archaeological evidence by studying the groups training or cultural proclivities.

=== Landscape ===
Terrain in the purely geographical sense has long been an element of archaeological investigations and reports, but terrain has a critical role that is part of not only battle field conflict but staging areas, routes for access and withdrawal, and movement before, during and after the conflict itself. An area for conflict and pre and post activities will yield significantly different kinds of materials for observation. Theaters of conflict between a colonial power and an indigenous group will most probably yield significantly different archaeological records. How the area was chosen, and to what purpose can reveal strategies and tactics such as siege or holding operations. Clandestine and guerrilla tactics will often manifest themselves in different kinds of bases and transport operations such as tunnels and caves.

=== Time and space ===
Time and space are also pivotal considerations for the study of conflict. Time may be measured in seconds or years even decades or longer. Opportunities for the deposition of archaeological evidence may consist of very minuscule traces to layers of multiple accumulations, all telling unique stories. The same applies to space. It too may range from a single event of ‘one on one’ contact to fields of conflict that are truly global in nature. The events that are small in physical scale, again may or may not leave much evidence, but the larger episodes my in fact completely alter the landscape. Large construction projects of camps, docks, airfields as well as fortifications may remain for centuries.

=== Alterity ===
Alterity is the concept of identifying those groups who have been omitted in traditional historical narratives, sometimes identified as 'others;. Conflict archaeology seeks to be more inclusive regarding non-traditional narratives that focus less on purely military aspects of battle. The roles of indigenous peoples, insurgents, and noncombatants have been greatly under reported in both the historic and archaeological reports on conflict. Adding to these should be women and children who are often integral elements in conflict scenarios as the adult male participants. These are often the under-reported participants of support, espionage, and partisan activities.

=== Colonialism ===
A close inspection of the documents of a period of colonialism will often reveal that the recordings of conflict will reflect the justifications of the subjecting power. These ‘histories’ may be nothing more than period propaganda and will often be perpetuated into long studied and repeated narratives. These will also ignore, or downplay, or intentionally omit the role of the subaltern players in those dramas. Examples of some of the new examinations range from the Fascist control over Ethiopia during the 1930s to massacres of Aboriginals in Australia.

=== Ethics ===
Recent innovations in the study and identification of human remains have been utilized in the last three decades is drawing the study of conflict and archaeology into prominence. Modern examples of extra-national conflicts, civil wars, episodes of genocide, concentration camps, ‘ethnic cleansing’ are producing execution sites, mass graves and other archaeological evidences. These episodes are heavily involving conflict archaeology into the legal theatre to augment evidence of war crimes and atrocities. The same recovery techniques are also being used to repatriate remains to families and provide closure to events that may span decades.
