= Two Men in a Trench =

- Genre: Documentary
- Starring: Tony Pollard and Neil Oliver
- Country of origin: United Kingdom
- Original language: English
- No. of seasons: 2
- No. of episodes: 12

Two Men in a Trench is a British comedic historical documentary television series, produced by the BBC, that ran from 2002 to 2004.

== Overview ==
Two Men in a Trench follows archaeologists Tony Pollard and Neil Oliver around the British Isles, where they visit ancient battlegrounds and use modern archaeological methods, bringing information about the battles and those who participated in them to their viewers. Pollard and Oliver take differing roles in their visits to each battleground, with Pollard taking a more hands on approach by visiting the sites and participating in more traditional archaeological methods, with excavation and hand-digging in the trenches among the most common. Oliver takes his expertise to others, performing research and interviewing experts on the battles themselves, as well as narrating the movement of the armies and detailing the mindset of the commanders taking part. It isn't a particularly grim rendition of the past either; oftentimes the two will have a pleasant rapport at the end of the episodes, and continually have comedic aspects slotted in, in order to keep the general tone of the episodes light-hearted.

== Series ==
=== Two Men in a Trench ===
Two Men in a Trench follows Pollard and Oliver across the British Isles, their research taking them to various battles across the United Kingdom. The battles of Flodden, Barnet and Shrewsbury, as well as the Siege of Newark and the Defence of Inchkeith, are among the conflicts studied by the duo in their first series.

=== Two Men in a Trench II ===
The second series of Two Men in a Trench, stylized as Two Men in a Trench II, takes Pollard and Oliver to a new set of locations, their exploits taking them to the archaeological locations of the battles of Bannockburn, Edgehill, Sedgemoor, Killiecrankie, RAF Hornchurch (former sector airfield used during the Battle of Britain), and the big guns near Dover.
