= Vikings (2012 TV series) =

- Genre: Documentary
- Written by: Neil Oliver
- Directed by: Jon Eastman (1); Rosie Schellenburg (2); Simon Winchcombe (3)
- Presented by: Neil Oliver
- Composer: Ty Unwin
- Country of origin: United Kingdom
- Original language: English
- No. of series: 1
- No. of episodes: 3

Production
- Executive producer: Eamon Hardy
- Producers: Cameron Balbirnie (series); Jon Eastman (1); Rosie Schellenburg (2); Simon Winchcombe (3)
- Production company: BBC Productions

Original release
- Network: BBC 2
- Release: 11 September – 25 September 2012

Vikings is a 2012 BBC television documentary series written and presented by Neil Oliver charting the rise of the Vikings from prehistoric times to the empire of Canute.

== Episodes ==
No.	Title	Original release date	UK viewers (millions)
1	"Who Were the Vikings"	11 September 2012	2.23
Oliver goes to Scandinavia to discover the mysterious world of the Vikings' prehistoric ancestors: the remains of weapon-filled war boats, long-haired Bronze Age farmers, and a Swedish site of a royal palace and gruesome pagan rituals from which the Viking Age was to suddenly erupt.
2	"The Trading Empire"	18 September 2012	2.09
Oliver heads east from the Scandinavian homelands, to trace the beginnings of a vast trading empire of Viking explorers through Russia and Turkey, starting from rivers of eastern Europe and ranging as far as Istanbul and Bagdad, to bring back Chinese silks and Buddhist statues. Within the Hagia Sophia in Istanbul, Viking runes were scratched into the marble. In the west, raids on Britain and Ireland commenced exploiting the wealth of Anglo-Saxon England.
3	"End of the Viking Age"	25 September 2012	1.82
Oliver heads west, tracing the Norse voyages of discovery to Iceland and Greenland. This episode also covers the first Danish kings and the Christian conversions, earlier than first thought, that opened the door to European high society. The blackmailing of English kings by way of the Danegeld culminated in a Viking conquest of England and the rise of Danish King Cnut (Canute), who eventually lost control of the Viking empire, ruled England for twenty years, and was interred in Winchester cathedral.

== Media ==
A 304-page book authored by Oliver and titled Vikings: A History was published by W&N on 4 October 2012. In addition, a 177-minute PAL region 2 DVD version of the series was released by the BBC on 12 November 2012

== See also ==
- Vikings (2013 TV series)
