= Alan Glynn =

Irish writer (born 1960)

- Born: 1960 (age 65–66)
- Education: Trinity College Dublin
- Writing career
- Notable work: The Dark Fields
- Notable awards: Irish Book Award
- Website: alanglynnbooks.com

Alan Glynn is an Irish writer born in 1960 in Dublin.

Glynn studied English literature at Trinity College Dublin.

== Awards and honours ==
- 2011 Irish Book Award, Crime Fiction category, Bloodland

== Works ==
=== Novels ===
- The Dark Fields (2001), republished as Limitless (2011) (ISBN 1582342245)
- Winterland (2009)
- Bloodland (2011)
- Graveland (2013)
- Paradime (2016) ISBN 978-1-250-06182-9
- Under the Night ISBN 9780571316267 (2019) (Alternative title: Receptor)

== Adaptations ==
- Limitless (2011, by Neil Burger). Was based on his novel The Dark Fields. This film inspired a TV series with the same name that debuted on CBS on September 22, 2015. After the success of the film, the novel was re-published under the name Limitless.

== Personal life ==
Glynn resides in Dublin. He is married, with two children.
