= Walking with Dinosaurs (2013 soundtrack) =

Film score by Paul Leonard-Morgan

Walking with Dinosaurs (Original Motion Picture Soundtrack)

Film score by Paul Leonard-Morgan
- Released: 24 December 2013
- Studios: Babelsberg Studio, Potsdam; AIR Studios, London
- Genre: Film score
- Length: 62:59
- Labels: Sony Classical; Metropolis Movie Music
- Producer: Paul Leonard-Morgan

Paul Leonard-Morgan chronology
The Numbers Station (2013)	Walking with Dinosaurs (2013)	Legendary (2014)

Walking with Dinosaurs (Original Motion Picture Soundtrack) is the soundtrack accompanying the 2013 film Walking with Dinosaurs based on BBC's 1999 television documentary miniseries of the same name. The film score is composed by Paul Leonard-Morgan and released under the Sony Classical Records and Metropolis Movie Music labels on 24 December 2013.

== Background ==
In May 2013, it was reported that David Hirschfelder would compose the musical score for Walking with Dinosaurs but was ultimately replaced by Paul Leonard-Morgan that August. Having never done an animated film before, with the exception of the Despicable Me short films he did for Illumination, Leonard-Morgan admitted his skepticisms on doing an animated film which had an $80 million dollar budget, but knew that he would write strong melodies and have lot of fun in his music, considering it as a natural progression from the Despicable Me short films. He described it as a "schizophrenic, energetic stuff".

The score was recorded at the Babelsberg Studio in Potsdam, Germany where Leonard-Morgan conducted the German Film Orchestra Babelsberg. Various instruments were recorded at multiple places including throat-singing and didgeridoo in New York City, harp, harmonica and vocalists in Los Angeles, tin whistle, violin, guitar and bass players in Scotland and percussions at the AIR Studios in London, where the score was also mixed there by audio engineer Rupert Coulson. Additional overdubs were done at Los Angeles.

Music composed and conducted by: Paul Leonard-Morgan

Orchestrations by; Richard Bronskill, Matt Dunkley & David Foster

Performed By; Filmorchestra Babelsberg

Overtone-Singing & Didgeridoo; Alex Glenfield

Recorded By; Brad Lauchert

Recorded By; GCR Audio Recorded Studio, NY, USA

Solo Low/High Whistle; Marc Duff

Guitar/Bass/Banjo; Ross Hamilton

Solo Violin; Fiona Hamilton

== Release ==
The score was released through Sony Classical Records and Metropolis Movie Music on 24 December 2013, four days after the film's release.

== Track listing ==
No.	Title	Length
1.	"Opening"	0:56
2.	"Offroading"	0:36
3.	"Transformation"	2:13
4.	"Mum"	0:53
5.	"Trudon"	1:02
6.	"The Forest"	1:07
7.	"Dino Heaven"	1:23
8.	"Back To The Nest"	0:28
9.	"Butterflies"	1:07
10.	"Migration"	1:50
11.	"Lightning"	0:59
12.	"Fire"	5:36
13.	"The Dinosaur March"	2:24
14.	"3 BFF"	1:18
15.	"No Natural Enemies"	1:10
16.	"River Attack"	3:01
17.	"Riding The Rapids"	1:45
18.	"Edmontosaurus"	3:08
19.	"Crab Dance"	1:54
20.	"Gorgo Sleeps"	2:20
21.	"Dino Western"	3:52
22.	"Growing Up"	2:56
23.	"You Know The Rules"	2:09
24.	"Thin Ice"	4:22
25.	"Scowler Duel"	7:27
26.	"Patchi The Hero"	5:01
27.	"Respect"	1:12
28.	"Baby Dino"	0:50
Total length:		62:59

== Reception ==
Michael Rechtshaffen, reviewing for The Hollywood Reporter, called Leonard-Morgan's score as "fantastic", while Peter Debruge of Variety noted it to be "functional". Tom Meek, reviewing for Paste, considered the choice of music to be "awkward, inappropriate and poorly synched". The score was one of 114 original scores from feature films that were determined by the Academy of Motion Picture Arts and Sciences to be eligible for the Academy Award for Best Original Score at the 86th Academy Awards. However, it did not make the final list of nominations.

== Promotional score ==
A promotional score was released in December 2013 by 20th Century Fox as a part of their For Your Consideration campaign for the 2013–14 film awards season.

No.	Title	Length
1.	"1M1 Opening"	1:01
2.	"1M2 Off Roading"	0:37
3.	"1M3 Alex Transformation"	2:18
4.	"1M4 Mum"	0:53
5.	"1M5 Trudon"	1:22
6.	"1M6 Dino Heaven"	2:36
7.	"1M7 Back to the Nest"	0:27
8.	"1M8 Butterflies"	1:09
9.	"2M1 Honky Tonk Dino"	0:48
10.	"2M2 Migration"	1:50
11.	"2M3 Lightning"	1:00
12.	"2M4 Fire"	5:40
13.	"2M5 Dino March"	2:46
14.	"2M6 3BFF"	1:20
15.	"2M7 No Natural Enemies"	1:10
16.	"2M8 Gorgo"	1:20
17.	"3M1 River Attack"	3:45
18.	"3M1B Riding the Rapids"	1:44
19.	"3M2 Edmontosaurus"	3:13
20.	"3M3 Crab Dance"	3:10
21.	"3M4 Gorgo Sleeps"	2:20
22.	"4M1 Dino Western"	3:55
23.	"4M2 Growing Up"	3:00
24.	"4M3 You Know the Rules"	2:09
25.	"4M4 Thin Ice"	4:26
26.	"4M5 Scowler Duel"	7:32
27.	"5M1 Patchi the Hero"	5:01
28.	"5M2 Respect"	0:27
29.	"5M3 Move Out"	0:46
30.	"5M4 Baby Dino"	0:50
Total length:		68:35

== Additional music ==
The following songs are featured in the film but not included in the soundtrack:

Additional music
No.	Title	Music	Length
1.	"Calling All Hearts"	Sanford Clark
2.	"What a Difference a Day Makes"	Tim Myers
3.	"I'm Gonna Love You Just a Little More Baby"	Barry White
4.	"Tusk"	Fleetwood Mac
5.	"Ends of the Earth"	Lord Huron
6.	"Live Like a Warrior"	Matisyahu
