= Bernard Wilkin =

Belgian historian

Dr. Bernard Wilkin (born 1982) is a Belgian historian specialising in the history of modern warfare. He works at the State Archives of Belgium and is a Fellow of the Royal Historical Society. Dr. Wilkin is the author of twelve books and articles. During his career, he has worked on the history of aerial propaganda during the First World War, French morale during the Phoney War and is a specialist of the Napoleonic wars. His research on the fate of the bodies of those killed during the battle of Waterloo was widely publicized around the world.

== Writing ==
Wilkin has written numerous books and articles on military history, propaganda and the history of crime. Along with his father, René Wilkin, he has released two books in English entitled Fighting for Napoléon and Fighting the British. Together, they have also published in French the previously unknown memoirs of French Hussard Jean Gheerbrant, a Flemish soldier of Napoleon who had written hundreds of pages of souvenirs, and the letters of hundreds of Belgian soldiers serving in the French army between 1799 and 1814.

He is also the author of several academic books and articles. His PhD thesis on aerial propaganda aimed at the occupied populations of the First World War was turned into a book for Routledge. Together with Maude Williams, Wilkin investigated the French military prior to the German offensive of May 1940, especially morale on the frontline. In 2021, he released a study on homicides in the province of Liège from 1796 to 1940. He also penned the same year a chapter on the Polish community of Liège and the criminal court in the book La Pologne des Belges. In December 2023, his article on the real fate of the Waterloo fallen was published by the Journal of Belgian History. The same month, he also released with Professor Bob Moore a new book called Escaping Nazi Europe: Understanding the Experience of Belgian Soldiers and Civilians in World War II with Routledge. In 2025, an article on the sale of fake relics from the Battle of Waterloo appeared in Napoleonica.

== Publications ==
=== Books ===
- With René Wilkin, Fighting for Napoleon: French soldiers' letters 1799-1815, Barnsley, 2015. ISBN 978-1399019668
- Aerial propaganda and the wartime occupation of France, 1914-1918, Oxon, 2016. ISBN 9781138329799
- With Joffrey Liénart, Voies d'eau, de terre et de fer : à la rencontre du patrimoine de Wallonie, Jambes, 2017. ISBN 9782930711195
- With René Wilkin, Fighting the British: French eyewitness accounts from the Napoleonic Wars, Barnsley, 2018. ISBN 9781473880818
- With Timothy Baycroft & Maude Williams, Wartime Interaction: confrontation, collusion and cooperation / Interactions en temps de guerre : confrontation, connivence et coopération (1870-1970), Brussels, 2017. ISBN 978-9492748584
- Correspondance du brigadier Armand Ghiot, prisonnier de guerre belge au Stalag IIB (1940-1945), Brussels, 2018. ISBN 9789492982025
- With Maude Williams, French soldiers' morale in the Phoney War 1939-1940, Oxon, 2018. ISBN 9780367583248
- With René Wilkin, Lettres de Grognards : la Grande armée en campagne, Paris, 2019. ISBN 9782204130783
- With Christian Remy & René Wilkin, Les mémoires de Jean Gheerbrant, hussard au Xe régiment, Bruxelles, 2021. ISBN 9782870440209
- With René Wilkin, Encyclopédie des homicides en province de Liège (1796-1940), Liège, 2021. ISBN 9782873513764
- With René Wilkin, Encyclopédie des homicides en province de Liège, volume 2 (1941-1980), Liège, 2022. ISBN 9782873513887
- Le crépuscule des adieux : de Fontainebleau à Sainte-Hélène, Brussels, 2023. ISBN 9789463914093
- With Bob Moore, Escaping Nazi Europe Understanding the Experiences of Belgian Soldiers and Civilians in World War II, Oxon, 2023. ISBN 9780367136420
- With Robin Schäfer, Bones of Contention: The Industrial exploitation of human bones in the modern age, Brussels, 2024. ISBN 978-9463914376
- With Johnny Sirlande, Vues de Liège: 80 photographies d'époque colorisées, Liège, 2024. ISBN 9782390102212
- With René Wilkin, Fighting the Russians: French Soldiers' Letters, 1799-1815, 2024. ISBN 9781399059626
- With Robin Schäfer, Jusqu'à la moëlle: L'exploitation industrielle des ossements humains à l'époque contemporaine, 2025. ISBN 9782931190258

=== Articles ===
- With Robin Schäfer and Arne Homann, 'Planting eagles': 200 years of Waterloo battlefield relic forgeries', in: Napoleonica the journal, 2, n° 9, 2025, 95-153.
- With Robin Schäfer & Tony Pollard, 'The real fate of the Waterloo fallen. The exploitation of bones in 19th century Belgium', in: Journal of Belgian History, LIII, 4, 2023, pp. 8–30.
- With Robin Schäfer & Arne Homann, 'Die Toten von Waterloo: Aus dem Massengrab in die Zuckerfabrik? / The dead of Waterloo: From the common grave to the sugar factory? / Les morts de Waterloo: A partir de la fosse commune à la sucrerie', in: Archäologie in Deutschland, 3, 2023, pp. 44–45.
- With Timothy Baycroft, 'The balloon post during the siege of Paris, 1870-71', in: War & Society, 42, 3, 2023, pp. 215–232.
- With Simon Catros, 'Sur les chemins de l’exode : les réfugiés belges dans l’Eure, 1940', in: Histoire, Économie et Société, 1, 2022, pp. 57–73.
- With Maude Williams, 'German Wartime Anglophobic Propaganda in France, 1914–1945', in: War in History, vol. 24, n. 1, 2017, pp. 28–43.
- 'Isolation, communication and propaganda in the occupied territories of France, 1914-1918', in: First World War Studies, 7, 3, 2016, pp. 229–242.
- 德国占领法国时期对英国海军的宣传，1914—1918 (The British Navy: topic of propaganda in occupied France, 1914-1918), in: Fudan Journal of Social Sciences, n. 5, 2015, pp. 64–70.
- 'Le génocide arménien et l'opinion publique française durant la Première Guerre Mondiale / The Armenian Genocide and the French public opinion', in: European Review of History, 21, 5, 2014, pp. 635–652.

== Media appearances ==
Wilkin features regularly in the media. In August 2022, his research, together with Tony Pollard and Robin Schäfer, on the bones of Waterloo was publicized in Belgium, Britain, France, Germany and in the US. In January 2023, Dr. Wilkin was interviewed on HistoryHit by Dan Snow in the show Bones in the Attic: The Forgotten Fallen of Waterloo. The same month, his discovery of several skeletons of soldiers killed during the battle of Waterloo triggered a new wave of media coverage.

In March 2023, the Belgian historian campaigned against the plan to convert a war memorial church in Liège into an upscale restaurant and climbing wall. He spoke out on several occasions in the Polish media in support of the preservation of the memorial to Polish soldiers killed in action located within the building.
