= Naomi Geraghty =

Irish film editor (born 1969)

Naomi S. Geraghty (born May 1969 in Dublin) is an Irish film editor. She is married to editor Joe Landauer.

== Filmography ==
- 1995: Dealers Among Dealers
- 1996: Some Mother's Son
- 1997: Cop Land
- 1998: Return to Paradise
- 1998: Practical Magic
- 1999: A Map of the World
- 2000: Blue Moon
- 2000-2001: The District (9 episodes)
- 2002: In America
- 2004: Hotel Rwanda
- 2006: The Illusionist
- 2007: The Lucky Ones
- 2007: Reservation Road
- 2011: Limitless
- 2016: Pelé: Birth of a Legend
- 2017: The Upside
- 2021: Voyagers
- 2023: The Marsh King's Daughter
