= The Dark Fields =

2001 techno-thriller novel by Alan Glynn

- US hardcover edition (2002) under original title, The Dark Fields.
- Author: Alan Glynn
- Language: English
- Subject: Human enhancement
- Genre: Techno-thriller
- Publisher: Little, Brown and Company
- Publication date: 2001
- Publication place: Ireland
- Media type: Print, e-book, audiobook
- Pages: 336 pp.
- ISBN: 1-58234-224-5

The Dark Fields is a 2001 techno-thriller novel by Irish writer Alan Glynn. It was re-released in March 2011 under the title Limitless, in order to coincide with its 2011 film adaptation.

== Plot ==
Eddie Spinola is a copywriter at a small publishing house in New York City. He starts using MDT-48, an experimental drug granting heightened intellectual, creative, and learning powers, and enabling its user to see meaningful patterns in large amounts of disparate data. Using his newly acquired intellect, Eddie amasses a small fortune short selling technology stocks. His trading escapades don't go unnoticed, and he is offered a job by billionaire tycoon Carl Van Loon, mediating the merger between entertainment giant MCL Parnasis and Abraxis, the country's second largest Internet service provider – a deal he sees to completion.

However, his indiscriminate use of the drug leads to panic attacks and blackouts. Eddie is suspected of bludgeoning to death Donatella Alvarez, the wife of a prominent Mexican artist, during an MDT induced fugue state. He further learns the full scope of the side-effects from his ex-wife Melissa, who had dabbled in the substance and suffered permanent neurocognitive damage, prompting him to gradually discontinue use of the drug.

Eddie initially reduces his intake to half a pill a day, but this quickly proves insufficient to maintain the level of mental acuity required to work out the details of the merger, and he is forced to increase the dosage. Realizing he is on a treadmill of addiction, Eddie tracks down another user, from whom he learns of the existence of a drug, readily available over the counter, capable of negating some of the harmful side-effects. Armed with this knowledge, Eddie resumes taking MDT and is filled with a renewed surge of energy and motivation.

This proves to be a mere stop-gap measure, as Eddie realizes the need to secure a steady supply. His stash running out, Eddie makes a desperate attempt to blackmail the pharmaceutical conglomerate responsible for developing MDT into providing him with continued access to the drug. His gambit fails when men break into his apartment and steal his remaining MDT. He then receives an anonymous phone call on his land-line informing him that he had been under surveillance all along, and an unwitting guinea pig in a clandestine clinical drug trial.

Facing imminent death from withdrawal, Eddie comes to terms with his own actions and travels to Mahopac, New York, where he seeks redemption by leaving a bag full of cash at his ex-wife's doorstep. He then continues driving aimlessly up north, and eventually checks into a remote motel along the Vermont highway, where he pens his account of the last few months of his life and the events leading to his ultimate downfall. As he drifts into a semi-conscious state, Eddie watches as the President – visibly under the influence of MDT – announces the deployment of US troops into Mexico in a televised address to the nation.

== Title ==
The epigraph of the book is a quotation from the closing lines of The Great Gatsby by F. Scott Fitzgerald:

He had come a long way to this blue lawn, and his dream must have seemed so close that he could hardly fail to grasp it. He did not know that it was already behind him, somewhere back in that vast obscurity beyond the city, where the dark fields of the republic rolled on under the night.

== Adaptations ==
=== Film ===
Limitless is a 2011 American thriller film based on The Dark Fields. The film was directed by Neil Burger and starred Bradley Cooper, Abbie Cornish, Andrew Howard and Robert De Niro. It was released in the United States and Canada on March 18, 2011.

The screenplay roughly mirrors the events portrayed in the book, albeit with a number of significant differences. For example, the novel is set during the peak and subsequent collapse of the Dot-com bubble and the "irrational exuberance" of the financial markets. In the film, while Eddie mentions adverse market conditions indicating a bear market, the viewer is never given a clear time frame for the events portrayed. Any mention of the growing tensions between the United States and Mexico is also absent from the movie adaptation, as is any reference to government involvement with MDT-48 (renamed NZT-48).

The role of several characters was also changed in the movie adaptation, while others are altogether absent. Hank Atwood, for instance, who is shown to be quite fond of Eddie in the novel, has no qualms about hiring a hitman to eliminate him and steal his supply of NZT in the film. Carl Van Loon, too, takes a similarly antagonistic view towards Eddie, whom he tries to blackmail into doing his political bidding in exchange for a steady supply of the drug. Van Loon's daughter, the object of Eddie infatuation in the novel, is replaced by Lindy – who leaves him at the beginning of the movie, only to rekindle their relationship after being charmed by Eddie's NZT persona.

The film has a happier ending, with Eddie surviving, and running for the US Senate.

Illuminating The Dark Fields is mentioned in the film as the name of the book written by the main character.

=== Television ===
A spinoff of the film based on the novel premiered in 2015, under the same title. It is a sequel which follows the events of the film.

== Sequel ==
A sequel to the book The Dark Fields, Under the Night, was announced by its author and Amazon indicated that the sequel (in ebook form) would be available as from 4 October 2018.

It was subsequently republished in America as Receptor: A Novel, released on 8 January 2019.

In 1950s Manhattan a man Ned Sweeney finds himself an unwitting participant in MK Ultra trials, the CIA's covert study of psychoactive drugs. The experiment introduces him to MDT-48, a mind-expanding smart drug, which takes him away from his wife and young son and straight to the corridors of the richest and most powerful people of his day. But before long, Ned is dead. Over 60 years later, Ned's grandson, Ray, meets Clay Proctor—a retired government official who may be able to illuminate not only Ned's life and death, but also the truth behind the mysterious MDT-48.

== See also ==
- Understand, a 1991 novelette by Ted Chiang, nominated for the 1992 Hugo Award for Best Novelette, and won the 1992 Asimov's Reader Poll.
- Lest We Remember, a 1982 short story by Isaac Asimov
- Flowers for Algernon, a 1958 short story by Daniel Keyes
