= Myth & Mogul: John DeLorean =

- Promotional poster
- Genre: Docu-series
- Directed by: Mike Connolly
- Composer: Paul Leonard-Morgan
- Country of origin: United Kingdom
- Original language: English
- No. of seasons: 1
- No. of episodes: 3

Production
- Producer: Chris Hegedus
- Cinematography: Mark Mc Cauley
- Editor: Jake Martin
- Running time: 41-48 minutes

Original release
- Network: Netflix
- Release: 30 July 2021

Myth & Mogul: John DeLorean is a 2021 British limited docuseries directed by Mike Connolly. Its story follows the life and turbulent career of automobile engineer and executive John DeLorean, which is told through archival footage and interviews. The series was released on 30 July 2021.

== Reception ==
The series received a 100% approval rating based on 7 votes on the review aggregator site Rotten Tomatoes.
