= Bombturbation =

Soil disturbance caused by explosions

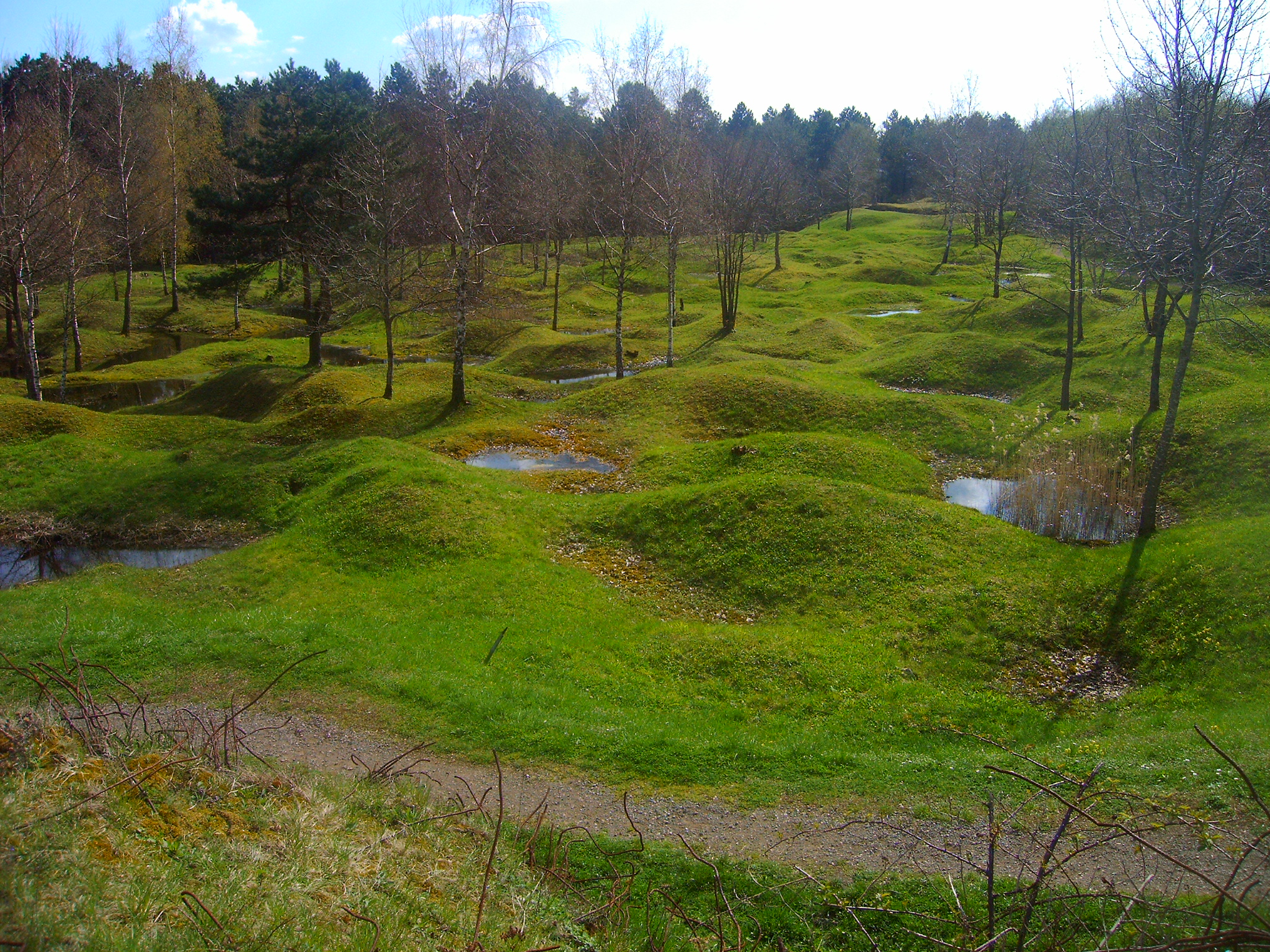
Part of the Verdun battlefield in 2005, showing the legacy of artillery shelling

Bombturbation is a type of soil disturbance created from extensive explosions, usually from battle or wars. It describes a region with extensive cratering on the soil surface and mixing of the soil itself via explosive munitions. The term was coined in a 2006 paper on soil science.

== As a soil mixing process ==
Bombturbation is a type of pedoturbation, similar to "impacturbation", the soil mixing caused by meteorite strikes. Unlike meteorite cratering, which rarely involves more than a single strike in any given place, bombturbation usually involves multiple overlapping explosions in the same area. Explosives also often disturb much deeper layers of the soil, even down to the bedrock. Bombturbation has only recently become a truly distinctive category of soil disturbance, tracing back to the development of high explosives for warfare in the 1900s.

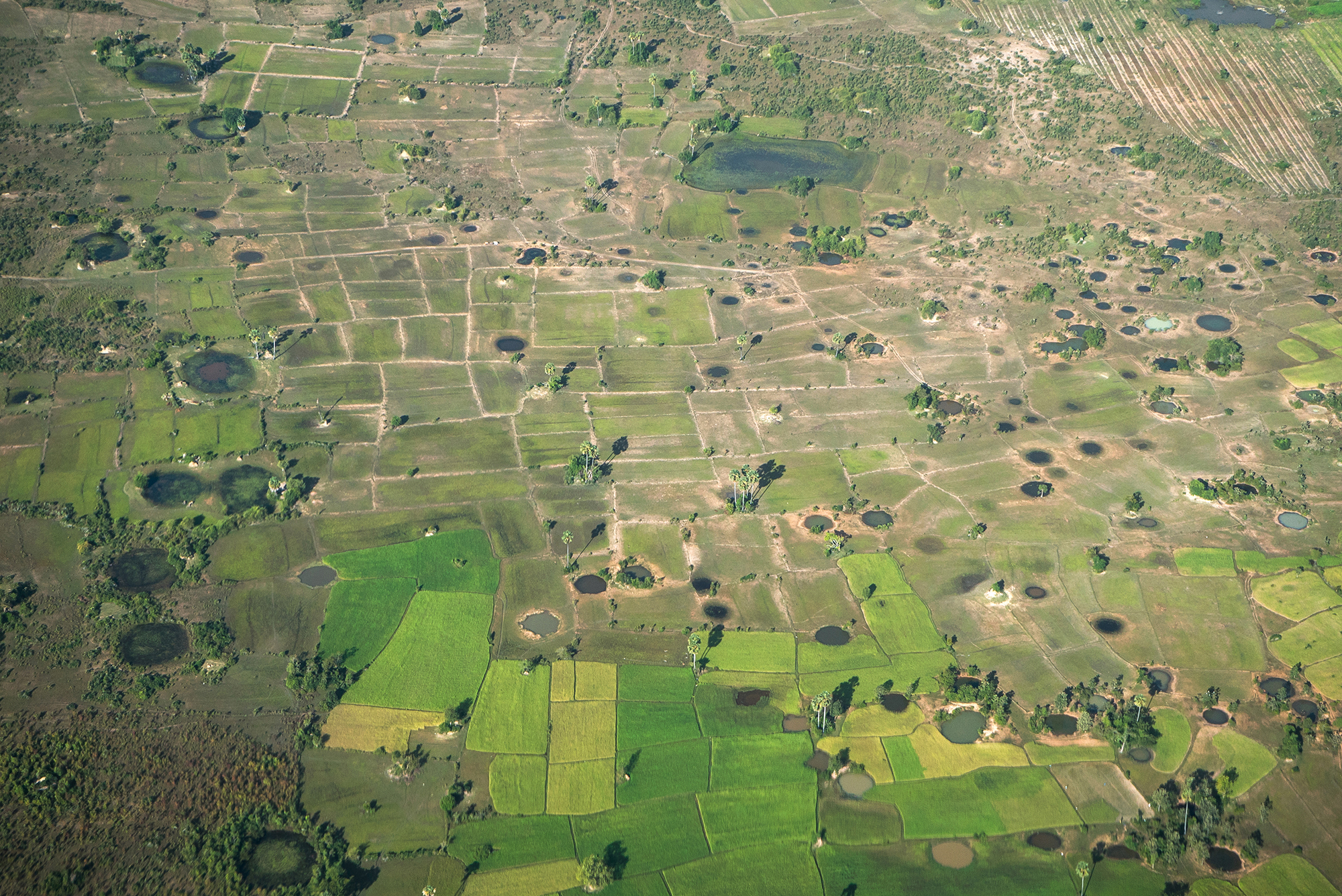
More distinct bomb craters in Cambodian fields, showing less dense bombturbation than in Verdun

The extensive cratering of the landscape changes drainage and weather patterns, which can in turn change the flora/fauna distribution at the location. Bombturbation also leads to soil contamination with heavy metals and explosives, which further change the soil composition beyond the physical disturbance of the soil layers. Remediation of the soil is possible, but it is expensive, and some bombturations are so extreme that the best available remediation option is to remove the soil and replace it. Changes in battle-disturbed soils after a war vary, due to their dependence on many complex factors, including post-war land-use patterns, climate, geomorphology, as well as animal and plant populations in the area.

== Examples ==
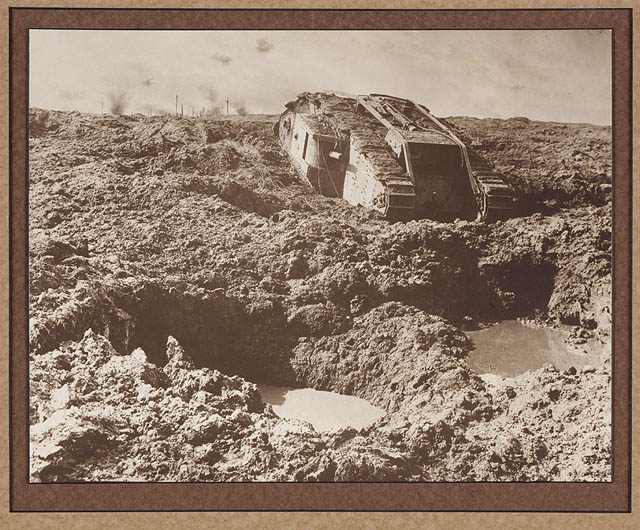
A broken-down tank stuck in muddy, freshly bombturbated ground

The two best-studied examples are the battlefields of World War I and the Vietnam War. From World War I, France still maintains the zone rouge, regions so badly contaminated with heavy metals and unexploded ordnance that habitation is prohibited.

== See also ==
- Environmental impact of war
