= Limitless (film) =

2011 American science fiction thriller film by Neil Burger

- Theatrical release poster
- Directed by: Neil Burger
- Screenplay by: Leslie Dixon
- Based on: The Dark Fields by Alan Glynn
- Produced by: Leslie Dixon; Scott Kroopf; Ryan Kavanaugh
- Starring: Bradley Cooper; Abbie Cornish; Andrew Howard; Anna Friel; Robert De Niro
- Cinematography: Jo Willems
- Edited by: Naomi Geraghty; Tracy Adams
- Music by: Paul Leonard-Morgan
- Production companies: Virgin Produced; Rogue; Many Rivers Productions; Boy of the Year; Intermedia Film
- Distributed by: Relativity Media
- Release dates: March 8, 2011 (New York City); March 18, 2011 (United States)
- Running time: 105 minutes
- Country: United States
- Language: English
- Budget: $27 million
- Box office: $161.8 million

Limitless is a 2011 American science fiction thriller film directed by Neil Burger and written by Leslie Dixon. Loosely based on the 2001 novel The Dark Fields by Alan Glynn, the film stars Bradley Cooper, Abbie Cornish, Andrew Howard, Anna Friel, and Robert De Niro. It follows Edward Morra, a struggling writer who is introduced to a drug called NZT-48 that greatly enhances his brain function, which helps him improve his lifestyle.

Limitless was released on March 18, 2011. Critical reviews were mixed-to-positive, and the film became a box-office success, grossing more than $161 million on a budget of $27 million. A television series covering events that take place after the film debuted in September 2015, running for one season.

== Plot ==
Eddie Morra is a struggling author in New York City. His girlfriend Lindy, frustrated with his lack of progress and ambition, breaks up with him. Eddie encounters Vernon, the brother of his ex-wife Melissa, who gives him a sample of a new nootropic called NZT-48, which Vernon implies will help Eddie with his "creative problems". Eddie tries the drug and discovers that he has acquired perfect recall, able to analyze minute details and information at incredible speed. Under the influence, he helps his landlord's wife with her law school homework, sleeps with her, cleans his apartment, and, now inspired, makes major progress on his book.

Eddie visits Vernon's apartment to learn more about the pill, but finds him badly beaten. Vernon, refusing to explain what happened, sends Eddie to run some errands. When Eddie returns, he finds Vernon murdered and his apartment ransacked. Before the police arrive, Eddie finds Vernon's stash of pills.

Eddie finishes his book and fantasizes about what he can accomplish on the drug, but with little money, he decides to day trade with a $100,000 loan from Gennady, a loan shark. He makes shocking gains and resumes his relationship with Lindy. His success leads to a meeting with finance tycoon Carl Van Loon, who tests him by seeking advice on a merger with rival Hank Atwood's company. After the meeting, Eddie experiences an 18-hour dissociative fugue, which he refers to as a "time skip."

The next day, before a meeting with Van Loon, Eddie finds out that his drug supply has run out, forcing him to go without it. During the meeting, Eddie sees on a news telecast that a woman has been murdered in her hotel room. Recognizing her as a woman with whom he slept during his time skip, he abruptly leaves.

Eddie learns that everyone who took NZT-48 is either hospitalized or dead. He repays Gennady but Gennady steals one pill, and, after trying it, harasses Eddie for more. He and Lindy are also pursued by a man in a trench coat, and she tells Eddie that she cannot be with him while he is on the drug. Using pills that he stashed at Lindy's apartment, Eddie experiments and learns to control his dosage, sleep schedule, and food intake to prevent side effects. He hires a laboratory to reverse-engineer the drug, an attorney to keep the police from investigating him, and two bodyguards to protect him from Gennady.

On the day of the merger, Atwood falls into a coma. Eddie recognizes Atwood's driver as the man in the trench coat and realizes that Atwood was on NZT-48 and is suffering from withdrawal. While Eddie participates in a police lineup, his attorney steals his supply of pills. Eddie enters into withdrawal, and while Van Loon questions him about Atwood's coma, Eddie receives a parcel containing the severed hands of his bodyguards.

He hurries home but Gennady breaks in, demanding more pills, which Eddie is finally out of. Gennady flaunts his abilities while injecting himself with NZT-48, explaining that direct injection into the bloodstream causes the effects to last longer. As Gennady prepares to eviscerate him, Eddie grabs his own knife and kills Gennady.

Eddie consumes Gennady's blood to ingest the last of the NZT-48. His mental abilities restored, he kills the remaining henchmen and finds the man in the trench coat, surmising that Atwood employed him to locate more NZT-48. Once Atwood dies, the two recover Eddie's stash from his attorney's apartment.

A year later, Eddie is running for the United States Senate. Van Loon visits him and reveals that he acquired the company that produced NZT-48 and shut down Eddie's laboratory. Acknowledging that Eddie will likely become President of the United States one day, Van Loon offers Eddie a continued supply of the drug in exchange for political support. Eddie tells Van Loon that he has already perfected the drug and weaned himself off it, retaining his abilities without side effects. Defeated, Van Loon leaves.

Eddie goes to lunch with Lindy. After Eddie speaks in fluent-sounding Mandarin with the waiter, Lindy looks at Eddie suspiciously. He looks at Lindy and asks, "What?"

== Cast ==
Cast listing in order as end credits appeared.

- Bradley Cooper as Eddie Morra
- Robert De Niro as Carl Van Loon
- Abbie Cornish as Lindy
- Anna Friel as Melissa Gant
- Johnny Whitworth as Vernon Gant
- Richard Bekins as Hank Atwood
- Robert John Burke as Don Pierce
- Tomas Arana as the Man in Tan Coat
- T.V. Carpio as Valerie
- Patricia Kalember as Mrs. Atwood
- Andrew Howard as Gennady
- Ned Eisenberg as Morris Brandt

== Production ==
Limitless is based on the novel The Dark Fields by Alan Glynn. The film is directed by Neil Burger, and is based on a screenplay by Leslie Dixon, who had acquired the rights to the source material. Dixon wrote the adapted screenplay for less than her regular price in exchange for being made one of the film's producers.

Fellow producer Scott Kroopf and she approached Burger to direct the film, at the time titled The Dark Fields. For Burger, who had written and directed his previous three films, the collaboration was his first foray solely as director. With Universal Pictures developing the project, Shia LaBeouf was announced in April 2008 to be cast as the film's star.

The project eventually moved to development under Relativity Media and Sir Richard Branson's Virgin Produced with Universal distributing through Relativity's Rogue Pictures. By November 2009, Bradley Cooper replaced LaBeouf in the starring role. Robert De Niro was cast opposite Cooper by March 2010, and The Dark Fields began filming in Philadelphia in May. Filming also took place in New York City. For a scene filmed in Puerto Vallarta, filmmakers sought a luxury car. Italian carmaker Maserati provided two Maserati GranTurismo coupes free in "a guerrilla-style approach" to product placement. By December 2010, The Dark Fields was re-titled Limitless.

The film notably incorporates fractal zooming, jump-cutting, and out-of-body scenes to convey the effect of the wonder drug on the protagonist. Green screens and motion-control photography were used to produce the visual effect of characters performing an action, and then turning around to see themselves doing that action again. The opening scene was created with still photographs stitched together using a variety of special-effects techniques.

== Release ==
Limitless had its world premiere in New York City on March 8, 2011. It was released in 2,756 theaters in the United States and Canada on March 18, 2011.

The film grossed $18.9 million on its opening weekend to rank first at the box office, beating other openers The Lincoln Lawyer and Paul, as well as carryovers Rango and Battle: Los Angeles. Limitless was released in the United Kingdom on March 23, 2011.

Before the film's release, Box Office Mojo called Limitless a "wild card", highlighting its "clearly articulated" premise and the pairing of Cooper and De Niro, but questioned a successful opening. The film opened at number one in its first week in the U.S. The film did well at the box office, earning some $79 million in the U.S. and Canada, as well as some $157 million worldwide against its $27 million budget.

== Reception ==
On review aggregator website Rotten Tomatoes, Limitless has an approval rating of 68% based on 202 reviews, with an average rating of 6.3/10. The site's critical consensus reads, "Although its script is uneven, Neil Burger directs Limitless with plenty of visual panache, and Bradley Cooper makes for a charismatic star." Metacritic assigned the film a weighted average score of 59 out of 100, based on 37 critics, indicating "mixed or average" reviews. Audiences polled by CinemaScore gave the film an average grade of "B+" on a scale of A+ to F.

Roger Ebert of the Chicago Sun-Times gave the film 2½ stars out of 4, and said it was "not terrifically good, but the premise is intriguing" and also stated that director Neil Burger uses "inventive visual effects". Lastly, adapting a line from the movie, he said, "Limitless only uses 15, maybe 20 percent of its brain. Still, that's more than a lot of movies do."

Kirk Honeycutt of The Hollywood Reporter wrote, "Limitless should be so much smarter than it is," finding that it took conventional plot turns and stuck closely to genre elements like Russian gangsters and Wall Street crooks. Honeycutt reserved praise for Cooper, Abbie Cornish, and Anna Friel. He also commended cinematographer Jo Willems' camerawork and Patrizia von Brandenstein's production design in the film's array of locales.

Variety's Robert Koehler called Limitless a "propulsive, unexpectedly funny thriller". Koehler wrote, "What makes the film so entertaining is its willingness to go far out, with transgressive touches and mind-bending images that take zoom and fish-eye shots to a new technical level, as the pill enables Eddie to experience astonishing new degrees of clarity, perception, and energy." He said of Cooper's performance, "Going from grungy to ultrasuave with a corresponding shift in attitude, Cooper shows off his range in a film he dominates from start to finish. The result is classic Hollywood star magnetism, engaging auds [audiences] physically and vocally, as his narration proves to be a crucial element of the pic's humor." The critic also positively compared Willems' cinematography to the style in Déjà Vu (2006) and commended the tempo set by the film's editors Naomi Geraghty and Tracy Adams and by composer Paul Leonard-Morgan.

Limitless received the award for Best Thriller at the 2011 Scream Awards and was nominated for Best Science Fiction Film at the 2012 Saturn Awards, but lost to Rise of the Planet of the Apes.

Limitless has been discussed in academic scholarly debates, notably on human enhancement.

Limitless is #16 on Bill Simmons’ “50 Most Rewatchable Movies of the 21st Century”.

== TV spin-off ==
Bradley Cooper announced in October 2013 that Leslie Dixon, Scott Kroopf, and he would be executive producers of a television series based on Limitless.

On November 3, 2014, CBS announced it would be financing a pilot episode to continue where the film left off. The pilot was directed by Marc Webb, with a script by Elementary executive producer Craig Sweeny. The pilot was screen-tested on June 1, 2015, with Jake McDorman, Jennifer Carpenter, Hill Harper, and Mary Elizabeth Mastrantonio starring. The main character was called Brian Finch and Bradley Cooper made regular appearances, reprising his role as Edward Morra.

The TV show premiered on CBS on September 22, 2015, with a 1.9 rating and was cancelled after one season.

== See also ==
- Flowers for Algernon, 1959 short story and 1966 novel
- Charly, 1968 film based on "Flowers for Algernon"
- Intellectual giftedness
- Lucy, 2014 film about a similar nootropic drug, CPH4
- Phenomenon, 1996 film
- The Lawnmower Man, 1992 film
- The Power, 1968 film
- Posthuman
- Transhumanist stories in television and film
- "Understand", 1991 novelette by Ted Chiang, nominated for the 1992 Hugo Award for Best Novelette, and winner of the 1992 Asimov's Reader Poll.
- Lest We Remember, 1982 short story by Isaac Asimov.
