= Anglocentrism =

Practice of viewing the world through the lens of English/Anglo-American culture

Anglocentrism is a cultural bias that prioritizes or elevates English or Anglo-American culture, language, and values as the standard or superior norm, often marginalizing or disregarding non-English-speaking or non-Anglo perspectives. This term is used to describe a bias that elevates English-speaking countries and their viewpoints over others, particularly in global discourse, education, media, and politics.

== Association with British imperialism ==
Historically, Anglocentrism emerged alongside British imperialism, where British norms and values were exported globally through colonization. In modern contexts, it often manifests in the dominance of the English language in international communication, academia, and business, with English-speaking countries (especially the United States and the United Kingdom) setting standards in many fields.

== Fostering cultural homogenization ==
Critics of Anglocentrism argue that it fosters cultural homogenization and erases the diversity of global voices. In educational settings, for example, Anglocentric curriculums may overlook non-Western knowledge systems or cultural contributions. Moreover, in media and politics, the prominence of English-speaking narratives may limit the representation of non-Anglo cultures and experiences.

As global interconnectedness grows, awareness of Anglocentrism and its effects has led to efforts to promote linguistic and cultural pluralism in international institutions and discourse.
