= Battlefield archaeology =

Sub-discipline of Archaeology

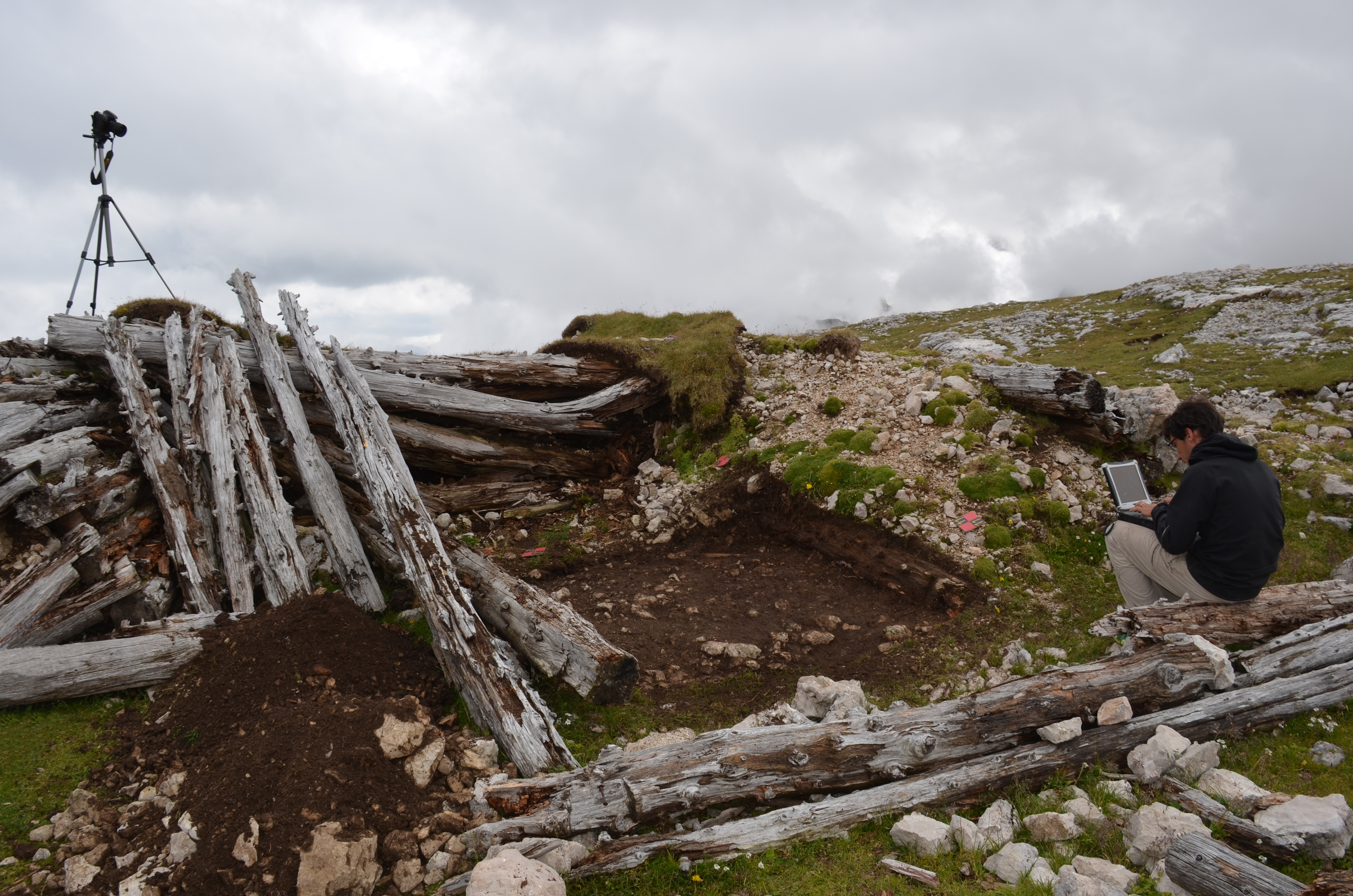
Survey of the remains of WWI fortifications near Col Bechei mountain, Italy

Battlefield archaeology is a sub-discipline of archaeology which studies the material remains and topography of a battlefield to understand a conflict. Archaeological battlefields consist of skirmishes, sieges, camps, and training sites. The study of the relationships and contexts of the material by-products of war give an alternate account to the version recorded in a history book, poem, or witness account, which may be constructed though bias, or may present only a limited perspective of the events. Examination of these locations gives insight to what tactics were being used, weapon modifications, and battle formations. It is not considered distinct from Military archaeology or Recceology (i.e., the recovery of surface finds and non-invasive site surveying).

Whilst the battlefield is a contemporary concept, the archaeology of battlefields incorporates the study of both ancient and modern military technologies, features and conflicts. It may also incorporate events such as civil unrest, including public demonstrations and riots. The discipline, therefore, applies the approaches and techniques of archaeology to military and civil conflict. Conflicts in the twentieth century in particular have been characterised by wars of ethnicity, nationality and identity, where civilians and civilian environments (i.e., domestic buildings, urban centres) have become involved in warfare, and are often inseparable from it. This is also known as 'Total War', understood by the engagement of entire populations and economies within the sphere of warfare. The archaeology of contemporary conflict, therefore, is a 'total' project, considering the impact of conflict and modern weapons systems on civilian as well as military targets.

Common artifacts would be cannons and firearm fragments from a Revolutionary War battle. Data cannot be counted as evidence until a pattern is found. An example would be a unique looking bullet. If the artifact doesn't match any other data collected, the piece more than likely wasn't part of the conflict being studied. Information is found through historical references, regional archaeologists, and previous studies.

Prosecution of battlefield thieves rarely occurs. Most penalties do not include jail time but usually involve a confiscation of items or metal detectors. Laws have been passed to deter criminals, but looting still occurs. The National Historic Preservation Act (NHPA) was one such act, but lacks penalties needed to deter crime.

== History ==
One of the earliest applications of battlefield archaeology was on the site of the battle of the Little Bighorn. While earlier archaeological work had occurred at battlefields in the United States such as earlier 1958 excavations at the Little Bighorn battlefield done by Robert Bray and a 1972 study by Dean Snow at the site of the Battles of Saratoga, the 1980s work at Little Bighorn done under the leadership of Douglas D. Scott was particularly influential, especially in its use of metal detectors.

In England, significant work has occurred at the site of the Battle of Towton (AD1461). Begun in late 1996/early 1997 by battlefield archaeologist Tim Sutherland, as a part of his Ph.D research, the site of the battle has been studied extensively using geophysical surveys, metal detector surveys, aerial photographic analysis as well as multiple archaeological excavations. The results of his work includes the discovery of mass graves which were disinterred in 1483, complete mass graves, triple burials in a single grave and single graves, all dating from the day of the battle, near to and in the surrounding area of Towton Hall, in Towton, near Tadcaster, Yorkshire. Work at Azincourt France, on the Battle of Agincourt Archaeology Project began in 2002, where Tim Sutherland carried out similar work to his successful work at Towton. A later survey was undertaken at the site of the battle of Naseby. Between 2006 and 2008 the Council for British Archaeology conducted a resource assessment for English Heritage, creating a database of more than 200 battlefields in England. According to the report, "battlefields [in England] older than 1066 are at present almost impossible to locate". By 2012 there was no comparable database for Europe, though 56 battlefields had been ascertained for Scotland. The Register of Historic Battlefields, now maintained by Historic England, was founded in 1995.

== Methods ==
=== Earthwork surveys ===
Earthwork surveys are the search for manmade modifications to the environment or ground such as trenches or holes. Depending on the time period of the battlefield being studied, earthwork surveys will exhibit varying degrees of success. Before modern history such as medieval history, open battlefields were the primary battlegrounds. Within the last two centuries, trench warfare has become increasingly popular allowing earthwork surveys to become far more useful. These time dependent characteristics on battlefields can typologically identify and date earthworks. This will help remove any potential confusion with other non-conflict related topographic locations.

=== Geophysical surveys ===
Battlefield archaeologists utilize a variety of geophysical instruments. These instruments have the ability to identify the irregularity (artifact, bone, wall) and omit any other background material such as dirt or naturally occurring elements.

==== Metal detector ====
The metal detector is the most common instrument used within battlefield archaeology. The location of fragments on metal are located by using an induced magnetic field within a certain proximity to the head of the detector. The quality of the instrument varies allowing for a range of depth quality. A metal detector generally works to a maximum depth of between 20–30 cm deep for smaller objects. Battlefield archaeologists are most successful with metal detectors when using them in large groups. Novice users of metal detectors can easily miss or record misleading data.

==== Fluxgate gradiometer ====
A fluxgate gradiometer records anomalies in the Earth’s magnetic field across a specific area. These detectors are especially useful when detecting ferrous items. They detect ferrous spikes when a piece of ferrous metal is close to the instrument. These instruments are most useful the more recent the site’s artifacts have existed. Since iron has a natural tendency to change over time, fluxgate gradiometers have a tendency to fail in identifying locations where iron is present. These devices are very successful when locating mass graves on battlefields. Depending on the strength of the magnetic anomaly, a fluxgate gradiometer can have various degrees of success. They generally work at a depth of around 50 cm.

==== Electrical earth resistance meter ====
An electrical earth resistance meter records differences in the electrical conductivity or water content within soil. These instruments are very effective at depths of less than 50 cm deep. Electrical Earth resistance meters are very successful at located recent graves because recent grave fills often exhibit different moisture content compared to surroundings.

==== Ground-penetrating radar (GPR) ====
Ground-penetrating radar sends out electromagnetic radiation pulses to detect and then reflect signals from subsurface structures. The electromagnetic conductivity can drastically affect the limit of the device although they are usually effective up to several meters deep. In order to be effective, the anomaly being investigated needs to be distinct from the background material.

=== Field walking ===
Field walking surveys are done by walking across a field looking for artifacts on the surface. A grid system is employed so as to mark the specific location an artifact was found and to map out the remaining artifacts in relation to each other. This process requires little expertise and minimal equipment as long as grid mapping is very effective and accurate. Depending on the circumstances, the artifacts are either collected or analyzed on site so their historical context is retained.

=== Desktop assessments ===
Desk-top assessments are performed by searching through text based documents pertaining to the site in question. These can include maps, photographs, primary sources, and secondary sources. The issue with desk-top assessments is that depending on the historical context, certain international conflicts can vary in accuracy.

== World War I archaeology ==
The First World War exhibited a conflict that mobilised large numbers of soldiers and a sophisticated and diverse array of material culture. Battlefield Archaeology in this arena has dealt with the battlefields of conflict, where human action and technology shaped the landscape into recognisable and extensive features. It also concerns the study of material culture associated with individuals: including 'trench art', such as engraved shells and the personal belongings of private soldiers, officers and civilian staff.

Excavations and survey work have also been conducted in southern Jordan, known for the conflict during World War I between Ottoman forces, Bedouin tribes-people and British forces commanded by T. E. Lawrence (the 'Great Arab Revolt'). The project looked for the militarised footprint of the conflict, basing its conclusions on trench systems, army camps and the refuse of forces (small-finds including coins, bullets and other military gear).

=== Hazards ===
Excavations on the Western Front often occur for humanitarian reasons, namely the recovery and identification of human remains and the disposal of unexploded ordnance. The unique conditions of Western Front excavations often pose a threat for archaeological excavations. For example, during the first five hours of the Kaiserschlacht ('German spring offensive'), over one million shells were fired by the Germans into the Allies' lines across the entire 150-mile front. The million shells fired during the beginning of the Spring Offensive are only a small sample of the total used during the war. Most of the shell casings were dumped on the battlefields and a considerable number of shells did not detonate upon impact. Archaeologists conducting excavations at World War I sites are often at risk not just from the unexploded ordnance but from the environmental pollution caused by the deterioration of ordnance, shell and bullet casings, and various other forms of battlefield debris. A study conducted at the Ypres battlefield in 2008 concluded that the highest level of copper contamination of the soil was over 200 mg/kg, which was higher than the background threshold of 17 mg/kg. The large area in France, where the levels of heavy metals from battlefield debris can negatively impact the health of flora and fauna is labeled by the French government as Zone Rouge (Red Zone). The French Government created Département du Déminage for the purpose of collecting and detonating unexploded ordnance in the Red Zone.

The majority of artillery shells recovered during archaeological excavations or by demining operations are from World War I. This is due to a revolution in shell design that occurred between the First and Second World Wars. In World War I, artillery shells were designed to detonate upon impact. Many times, the detonator would not activate, resulting in the large number of duds. By the time of the Second World War, the detonator for artillery shells was hooked up to a timer. The intention was for the shell to explode over the enemy, raining shrapnel on them.

=== Bombturbation ===
Archaeological excavations on the Western Front (World War I) have also helped to identify a unique soil condition that is only found in the context of battlefield archaeology. This unique soil condition is known as bombturbation. Intense artillery barrages, (and airstrikes in later conflicts) cause large amounts of deforestation. Additionally, bombardment creates large craters and mixes the soil layers together in unique ways. As a result, methods of stratigraphic analysis must take into account this unique phenomenon when analyzing a site related to World War I.

=== Mass graves ===
Mass graves resulting from former conflicts are relatively rare. Famous examples can be found at; the Battle of Visby (AD1361) on Gotland, Sweden: The Battle of Towton (AD1461) Towton near Tadcaster, Yorkshire, England: The Battle of Mohács (AD1526), Hungary. A noteworthy burial site contains the remains of thirty-one British soldiers at Le Pont de Jure. It is thought that these soldiers died in April 1917 during successful British assaults on the German trenches in the area. The burials for the soldiers were carefully prepared. The distance between each body was roughly equal, showing that time was taken to carefully measure the locations of each. The bodies were buried with their arms placed across their chests. Two bodies show evidence of having been victims of artillery or other high explosives, with only one arm, one leg, and half a skull between the two of them. The two victims were also buried alongside two pairs of empty boots. When these soldiers died, these may have been the only recognizable body parts lefts to bury.

Mass grave sites sometimes reuses preexisting trenches or artillery craters. One example would be the German mass burials at Gavrelle. It contained twelve German soldiers of the 152nd Infantry Regiment of the 48th division.

== Bibliography ==
- Carman, J. (2020). "Battlefield Archaeology". In Smith, Claire (ed.). Encyclopedia of Global Archaeology. pp. 1351–1358. doi:10.1007/978-3-030-30018-0_1330. ISBN 978-3-030-30016-6.
- Foard, G. and Morris R. (2012) The Archaeology of English Battlefields (CBA Research Report 168). Council for British Archaeology. doi:10.5284/1081823
- Gassend J-L. (2014) Autopsy of a Battle, the Liberation of the French Riviera. Schiffer Publishing.
- Homann, A. (2013) Battlefield Archaeology of Central Europe: With a Focus on Early Modern Battlefields. In: Natascha Mehler (Ed.), Historical Archaeology in Central Europe. Society for Historical Archaeology, S. 203-230. (SHA Special Publication Nr. 10) Full Text
- Lees, W. (2025) Honey Springs, Oklahoma: Historical Archaeology of a Civil War Battlefield. Texas A&M University Press.
- Schofield, A.J. et al. (2002) Matériel Culture: The Archaeology of 20th Century Conflict. Routledge.
- Schürger, A. (2015) The Battle of Lützen: an examination of 17th century military material culture. University of Glasgow
- Sutherland, T.L. (2005) Battlefield Archaeology - A Guide to the Archaeology of Conflict
