= Neil Oliver =

British television presenter

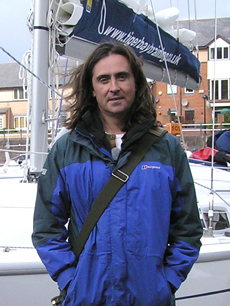
- Oliver in 2006
- Born: 21 February 1967; Renfrew, Scotland
- Citizenship: British
- Education: University of Glasgow
- Occupations: Television presenter, author, historian
- Years active: 2002 – present
- Children: 3
- Website: neiloliver.com

Neil Oliver is a Scottish television presenter and author. He has presented several documentary series on archaeology and history, including A History of Scotland, Vikings and Coast. He is also an author of popular history books and historical fiction.

He was the president of the National Trust for Scotland from 2017 to 2020.

Since April 2021 Oliver has been a presenter for UK news and opinion channel GB News.

He has expressed unscientific views on COVID-19 and climate change, and conspiracy theories on world government.

== Early life and education ==
Oliver was born in Renfrew and raised in Ayr and Dumfries, where he attended Dumfries Academy and then the University of Glasgow. He obtained an MA (Hons) in archaeology and then worked as a freelance archaeologist before training as a journalist.

== Career ==
Oliver first appeared on television in the 2002 BBC Two series Two Men in a Trench, in which he and archaeologist Tony Pollard visited historic British battlefields. He was also a co-author of the two books accompanying the series. In 2006 he presented The Face of Britain for Channel 4 and Scotland's History: The Top Ten for the BBC. Early in his career he also appeared on The One Show and Time Team.

Oliver was a co-presenter of the first series of Coast in 2005 and replaced Nicholas Crane as the show's main presenter for the second, third, fourth and fifth series. He also presented Coast Australia (2013) and Coast New Zealand (2016).

From 2006 to 2018, Oliver presented a number of history documentaries for the BBC, including A History of Scotland (2008) and Sacred Wonders of Britain (2013). In 2012 he wrote and presented Vikings, a three-part series on the Vikings.

In April 2021, Oliver was announced as a presenter for GB News where he hosts a weekly current affairs and interview programme.

Oliver wrote a weekly column for The Sunday Times from 2016 until 2022.

=== Recognition ===
In July 2015 he was awarded an Honorary Doctorate of Letters by the University of Glasgow, having previously received the same degree in November 2011 from the University of Abertay Dundee.

He was in 2019 listed as a patron of the Association of Lighthouse Keepers.

In June 2025 his recorded commentary for the City Sightseeing buses in Glasgow, which featured a picture of his face on the side of the vehicles, was dropped four years after calls were made to remove it.

== Political views ==
=== Scottish independence ===
In 2014 Oliver stated that he was "proud of Britain" ahead of the Scottish independence referendum, saying that "this kind of internecine squabbling puts my teeth on edge. I would rather that it would just go away—or that it had never happened" and that he "liked the status quo". When he was appointed President of the National Trust for Scotland, thousands signed petitions calling on him to resign. In 2020, Oliver reasserted his opposition to Scottish independence, describing the uncertainty caused by the prospect of a second referendum as a "cancerous presence" and saying that "I'm a British citizen, that's how I see myself. Not in an argumentative way, I don't see that I should have to cede my right to understand myself as I am to some politician."

=== COVID-19 ===
Commenting on the British government's response to the coronavirus pandemic in 2021, Oliver said, "Lockdown is the biggest single mistake in world history". He also criticised the drive to vaccinate children in the UK against COVID-19, and likened the fight against government anti-COVID measures to the fight against Nazi Germany. Oliver's opposition to coronavirus restrictions led to his leaving the unionist campaign group These Islands. Author Tom Holland, an advisory board member of These Islands, said that Oliver's "current focus was not compatible with our own". In January 2024, on GB News Oliver promoted the conspiracy theory that the coronavirus vaccine caused "turbo-cancer" in children.

=== World government ===
During a monologue delivered on his GB News programme on 4 February 2023, Oliver spoke of a "silent war" waged by generations of politicians in order to take "total control of the people" and impose "one-world government". According to The Guardian, the monologue apparently referred to Silent Weapons for Quiet Wars, an alleged conspiracy theory document. The Board of Deputies of British Jews and the All-Party Parliamentary Group against Antisemitism both issued statements calling on GB News to stop indulging antisemitic conspiracy theories.

In May 2023, Oliver retweeted an image featuring Bill Gates, writing "Bill Gates: the text book example of the danger posed by rich and powerful people utterly devoid of empathy or care for individual human life". According to The Jewish Chronicle, "The image features Nazi, Satanic, and Illuminati imagery with reference to the New World Order – a conspiracy involving a shadow totalitarian world government – Jeffrey Epstein, Anthony Fauci (former chief medical advisor to US President Joe Biden) the United Nations, and big pharma". Broadcaster Matthew Sweet commented that the image appeared "to make mockery of the Holocaust by depicting Bill Gates as a Nazi experimenter with a swastika and IG Farben logo, which is presumably a reference to slave labour in Auschwitz".

=== Climate change ===
In July 2023, Oliver asserted on GB News that the "terrifying" temperatures reported during the heatwave in southern Europe were false and accused the BBC and others of fearmongering over climate change. He alleged that ground temperatures instead of air temperatures were being used. Meteorologist and BBC weatherman Tomasz Schafernaker answered the claims saying this was "absolutely not true".

== Personal life ==
Oliver lives in Stirling with his wife, three children and two Irish Wolfhounds, Jessie and Gracie. On November 6th 2026, he reposted his own tweet from April 4th 2025, featuring a picture of himself and Russell Brand, with the caption "@RustyRockets (Brand's Twitter Handle) is my friend.". The repost contains the new caption "still is".

== Works ==
=== Television ===
Year	Title	Role	Notes	Refs
2002–2004	Two Men in a Trench	Presenter		
2005–2010	Coast	Presenter	Lead presenter, series 2–5	
2006	The Face of Britain			
2006	Time Team		Episode: "Big Royal Dig"	
2007	The One Show			
2007	The History Detectives			
2008	A History of Scotland	Presenter		
2009	Cleopatra: Portrait of a Killer	Presenter		
2011	A History of Ancient Britain	Presenter		
2011	A History of Celtic Britain	Presenter		
2011	The Last Explorers	Presenter	Documentary series	
2012	Vikings	Writer / Presenter		
2013	Sacred Wonders of Britain	Presenter		
2013–2015	Coast Australia	Presenter		
2015	Britain's Deadliest Rail Disaster: Quintinshill	Presenter	Documentary	
2015	The Celts: Blood, Iron and Sacrifice	Presenter		
2016	Coast New Zealand	Presenter		
2016	Scotland and the Clan	Presenter		
2016	Robot Wars	Contestant		
2017	Britain's Ancient Capital: Secrets of Orkney	Presenter		
2018	Rise of the Clans	Presenter		

=== Books ===
- The Story of the World in 100 Moments (2021)
- Wisdom of the Ancients (2020)
- The Story of the British Isles in 100 Places (2018)
- Master of Shadows (2015)
- Vikings (2012)
- A History of Ancient Britain (2011)
- A History of Scotland (2009)
- Amazing Tales for Making Men Out of Boys (2008)
- Coast from the Air (2007)
- Not Forgotten (2006)
- Castles and Forts (with Simon Adams and Tony Pollard) (2006)
- Two Men in a Trench II: Uncovering the Secrets of British Battlefields (with Tony Pollard) (2003)
- Two Men in a Trench: Battlefield Archaeology – The Key to Unlocking the Past (with Tony Pollard) (2002)
