= Towton Hall =

Building in Towton, North Yorkshire, England

Coordinates: 53.8500°N 1.2654°W

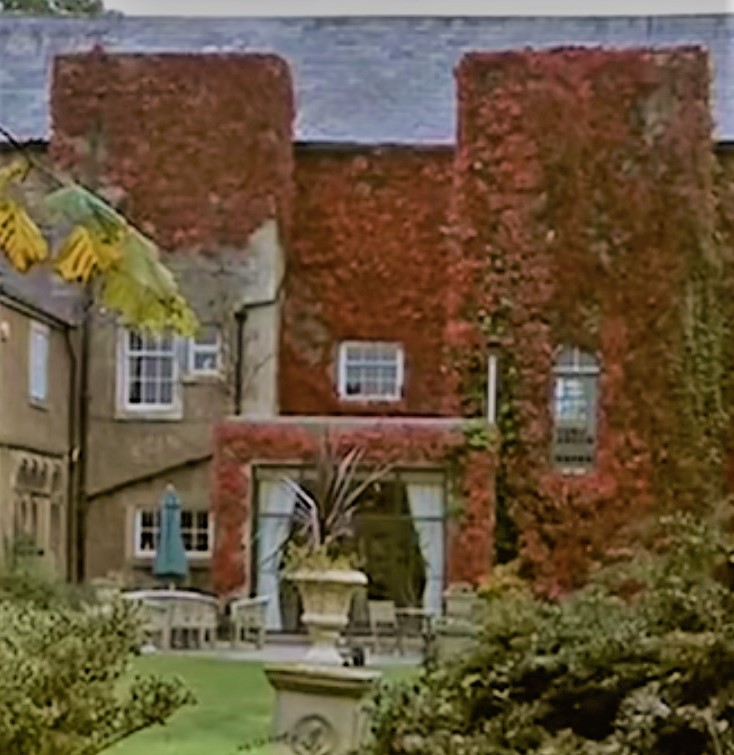
Towton Hall, Towton

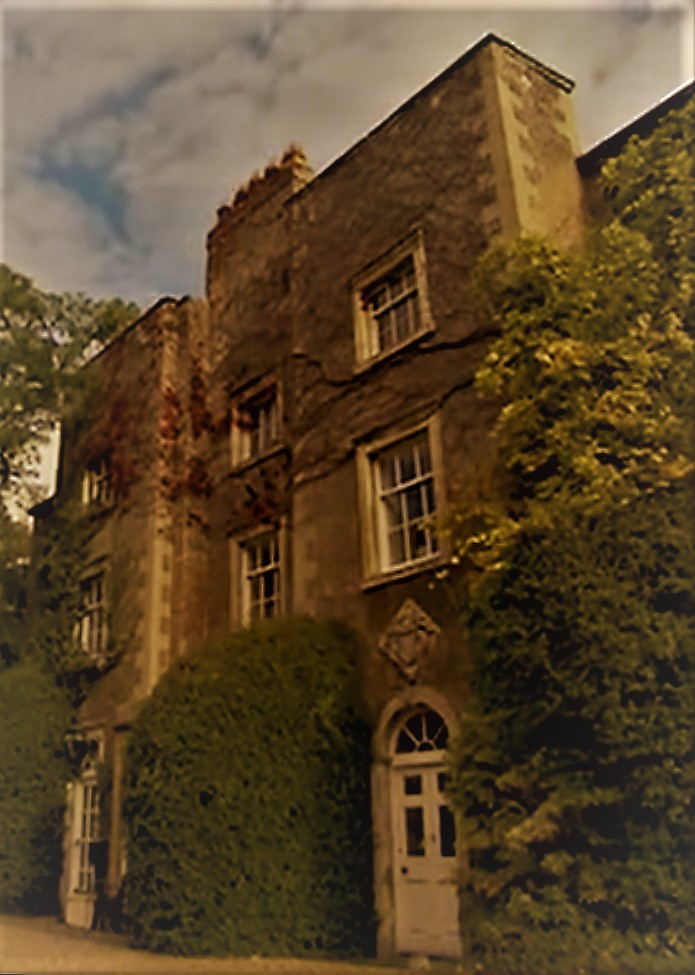
Towton Hall, Towton

Towton Hall is a mansion, a home, near the village of Towton in North Yorkshire, England. The building, known to have been built as a residence in the seventeenth century and renovated and expanded since, is also believed to include the remnants of Richard III’s commemorative chantry chapel, which was built after the Battle of Towton. The commemorative chantry chapel at the Towton Battlefield was built to remember the victory of the House of York in the battle of Towton in the years after the 1461 battle. Many male skeletons of the soldiers were discovered beneath the floor of the dining room of Towton Hall.
