= Lest We Remember =

1982 short story by Isaac Asimov

"Lest We Remember" is a science fiction short story by American writer Isaac Asimov. It first appeared in the February 1982 issue of Asimov's Science Fiction and was reprinted in the collections The Winds of Change and Other Stories (1983) and Robot Dreams (1986).

== Plot summary ==
John Heath is a "dead average" man working for Quantum Pharmaceuticals. Unhappy with his average position in the company and in life, he searches for a way to improve himself and at the same time impress his fiancée, Susan Collins. When researchers from Quantum give him the opportunity, he volunteers to be a test subject for a new drug that allows total memory recall. When the drug succeeds and John is able to remember everything and anything that he has ever read or heard down to the exact word, he goes on a rampage to climb the corporate ladder in his company, blackmailing his superiors into acceding to his demands. When his bosses and the researchers who gave him the drug trick him and lock him in one of the rooms in the office building, they try to inject him with the antidote for the recall drug. Susan, however, comes to his rescue, and although they never succeed in giving him the antidote (after he suffers a traumatic shock, the bosses believe he has lost the power), John promises to Susan never to use his new power for malevolence, while the possibility remains open that maybe one day everyone could possess that ability.

== See also ==
- Limitless – 2011 film where the main character on the drug, has perfect recall.
