= Eto =

Eto is a Japanese surname and given name. People with the name include:

== Surname ==
- Akinori Eto (江渡 聡徳, born 1955), Japanese politician
- Akira Eto (江藤 智, born 1970), Japanese baseball player
- Batara Eto (born 1979), Indonesian-Japanese businessman
- Hajime Eto (衛藤 元, born 1973), Japanese footballer
- Izumi Eto (江藤 泉, born 1935), Japanese sprint canoer
- Jun Etō (江藤 淳, 1932–1999), Japanese literary critic
- Ken Eto (1919–2004), Japanese-American mobster
- Kimio Eto (衛藤 公雄, 1924–2012), Japanese musician
- Kohei Eto (衛藤 晃平, born 1982), Japanese basketball coach
- Koki Eto (江藤 光喜, born 1988), Japanese boxer
- Kosaburo Eto (江藤 小三郎, 1946–1969), Japanese social activist
- Eto Kyōsuke (江渡 恭助, 1881–1917), Japanese naval officer
- Masaki Eto (江藤 正基, born 1954), Japanese sport wrestler
- Mikiya Eto (衛藤 幹弥, born 1999), Japanese footballer
- Misa Etō (衛藤 美彩, born 1993), Japanese idol and tarento
- Naomi Eto (江藤 直美, born 1972), Japanese volleyball player
- Rie Eto (衛藤 利恵, born 1973), Japanese singer
- Rie Eto (badminton) (江藤 理恵, born 1988), Japanese badminton player
- Sachiko Eto (江藤 幸子, 1947–2012), Japanese cult leader and serial killer
- Seiichi Eto (衛藤 晟一, born 1947), Japanese politician
- Seishirō Etō (衛藤 征士郎, born 1941), Japanese politician
- Shinichi Eto (江藤 愼一, 1937–2008), Japanese baseball player
- Etō Shinpei (江藤 新平, 1834–1874), Japanese statesman
- Takami Eto (江藤 隆美, 1925–2007), Japanese politician
- Takashi Eto (衛藤 昂, born 1991), Japanese athlete
- Taku Etō (江藤 拓, born 1960), Japanese politician
- Toshiya Eto (江藤 俊哉, 1927–2008), Japanese violinist
- Yu Eto (衛藤 裕, born 1983), Japanese footballer

== Given name ==
- Eto Mori (森 絵都, born 1968), Japanese novelist
- Eto Nabuli (born 1988), Fijian-Australian rugby footballer

== Fictional characters ==
- Eto Demerzel, a recurring character in Isaac Asimov's books
- Eto Yoshimura (芳村 愛支), an antagonist In the manga Tokyo Ghoul

== See also ==
- ETO (disambiguation)
- Eto'o (surname)
