= Etoo =

Etoo may refer to:

- Eto'o (surname), a Cameroonian surname
- Etoo, Narrabri Shire, Baradine County, New South Wales, Australia; a parish
- Etoo State Forest, Western Region, New South Wales, Australia; a forest, see State Forests of New South Wales
- "Etoo" (song), a song by Black Harmony

== See also ==
- Etoos, an education company subsidiary of SK Communications
- Etto
- EETO
- ETO (disambiguation)
