= Eato =

Eato is a surname. Notable people with the surname include:

- Alwyn Eato (1929–2008), English cricket player
- Mary E. Eato (1844–1915), African-American suffragist and teacher

== See also ==
- Eaton (surname)
- Eto
- Itō (name)
