= Etienne Eto'o =

Etienne Eto'o is the name of:

- Etienne Eto'o (footballer, born 1990), brother of Samuel Eto'o
- Etienne Eto'o (footballer, born 2002), son of Samuel Eto'o
