= Eto'o (surname) =

Samuel Eto'o (born 1981) is a Cameroonian football administrator and former striker.

Eto'o is a Cameroonian surname that may also refer to:

- David Eto'o (born 1987), Cameroonian football winger and brother of Samuel
- Etienne Eto'o (footballer, born 1990), Cameroonian football striker and brother of Samuel
- James Eto'o (born 2000), Cameroonian defensive midfielder for CSKA Sofia
- Etienne Eto'o (footballer, born 2002), Cameroonian football forward and son of Samuel

== See also ==
- Etoo (disambiguation)
