= List of Foundation series characters =

List of characters in Isaac Asimov's Foundation series

The Foundation series is a science fiction book series written by American author Isaac Asimov. First published as a series of short stories and novellas from 1942 to 1950, and subsequently in three collections, for nearly thirty years the series was a trilogy: Foundation (1951); Foundation and Empire (1952); and Second Foundation (1953). It won the one-time Hugo Award for "Best All-Time Series" in 1966. Asimov later added new volumes, with two sequels, Foundation's Edge (1982) and Foundation and Earth (1986), and two prequels, Prelude to Foundation (1988) and Forward the Foundation (1993).

The premise of the stories is that in the waning days of a still powerful Galactic Empire, the mathematician Hari Seldon spends his life developing a theory of psychohistory, a new and effective mathematics of sociology. Using statistical laws of mass action, it can predict the future of large populations. Seldon foresees the imminent fall of the Empire, which encompasses the entire Milky Way, and a Dark Age lasting 30,000 years before a second empire arises. Although the momentum of the Empire's fall is too great to stop, Seldon devises a plan by which "the onrushing mass of events must be deflected just a little" to eventually limit this interregnum to just one thousand years.

The plot of the Foundation series spans centuries, and its various characters each appear in one or two of its nine installments. Charles Elkins described its characters as "undifferentiated and one-dimensional" speaking with an "impoverished vocabulary". He wrote that their consciousness "shows absolutely no historical development and hence fails to evoke in the reader any feeling for the future universe they inhabit". Elkins argued that characterization in general is subordinated to the overall conception of Asimov's project. James E. Gunn wrote that though the series of lead characters Lathan Devers, Salvor Hardin, Limmar Ponyets and Hober Mallow "may seem interchangeable", they are "as differentiated as the personages in most histories."

Through the eyes of the characters the inevitability of the forces of history, made manifest in the Seldon Plan, is demonstrated to the reader repeatedly. Elkins sees the characters in Foundation not as "tragic heroes. They are nondescript pawns, unable to take their destiny into their own hands." Only those elite few characters who understand the Plan can be considered free, with the Mule through his non-human psychic powers as the only exception. But while Elkins attributes the Foundation series a sense of "pervading fatalism", Gunn and Nicolas David Gevers point out that the obstacles presented in Asimov's galactic history are overcome by active individual characters "through the initiative and competence which the Foundations nurture in their citizens". Donald E. Palumbo asserts that it is exactly the "flatness of character and setting" which permit the series "to be a masterpiece". The heroism and depth of individual characters is consciously taken back by Asimov for the true hero of the series to stand out: "the sublime history of humankind itself".

An eight-part radio adaptation of the original three novels, called The Foundation Trilogy, was broadcast on BBC Radio 4 in 1973.

In 2021, Apple TV+ premiered a television series adaptation of the novels, Foundation, created by David S. Goyer and Josh Friedman. In 2023, Asimov's daughter Robyn Asimov, an executive producer for the series, said:

I love the character development. That was not my father's strong suit, and not necessarily his interest per se. It was all about the storytelling, and he did that so well that it was okay that the characters were a bit flat. What David [S. Goyer] did was especially ... I love the Cleon story. He gave life to these characters, and it brought the story to another level. The story was great anyway, but I think if, if my father had lived to see this, I think he would have been very, very impressed. My father would have loved to have seen the characters come to life. That's something that was not in his wheelhouse per se. And I think this would have excited him.

== Ducem Barr ==
In the Foundation and Empire (1952) story "The General", Imperial General Bel Riose of Siwenna coerces Ducem Barr to aid him in his persecution of the Foundation, which Riose hopes to destroy both as a perceived threat to the Galactic Empire and to further his own ambitions. Barr is Riose's best choice as an "expert" on the Foundation, his father Onum having met Foundation-aligned Master Trader Hober Mallow during the events of "The Merchant Princes" in Foundation (1951). Barr aligns himself with Lathan Devers, a Foundation trader who has let himself be captured by Riose to disrupt the general's operation from the inside. When Devers' machinations are exposed, Barr helps him escape further interrogation by knocking Riose unconscious and fleeing the planet with Devers in tow. They travel to the Imperial capital planet, Trantor, and plot to implicate Riose and Emperor Cleon II's Privy Secretary Ammel Brodrig in a nonexistent conspiracy to overthrow Cleon. Though Barr and Devers are caught by the Secret Police, they escape and later learn that Riose and Brodrig have been arrested for treason and executed.

Josh Wimmer and Alasdair Wilkins of Gizmodo described Barr as an old revolutionary and assassin who "hates the Empire like no other character in the series", and sees the Foundation's predictions about the fall of the Empire as the vengeance he could never have imagined for his lost family and ruined planet. In the last chapter, Asimov uses the character of Barr to explain the political dynamics of why Riose would never have been able to defeat the Foundation: a strong emperor's sense of self-preservation would never allow him to tolerate a subordinate who develops potentially threatening power. Wimmer and Wilkens called Barr a "great character ... and his world-weary pragmatism coupled with supreme faith in the Seldon Plan is an intriguing combination."

Barr is voiced by Peter Howell in episode four "The General" of the 1973 BBC Radio 4 adaptation The Foundation Trilogy.

Barr is portrayed by Jesper Christensen in season two of the 2021 Apple TV+ television series adaptation Foundation. In the 2023 episode "A Glimpse of Darkness", Barr witnesses a presentation on Siwenna by High Claric Poly Verisof and Brother Constant of the Church of the Galactic Spirit, extolling the virtues of the Foundation and Seldon's predictions. He records it using special technology in his left eye. In "Where the Stars are Scattered Thinly", Bel Riose and his husband/second-in-command Glawen Curr visit Barr to follow up on the recording. Barr, an Imperial loyalist, has been sending reports to the Empire for 40 years, none of which have been acknowledged until now. Riose and Curr learn that the Foundation has provided the clarics with auras, protective force shield technology forbidden to everyone except the Emperors, and whisper-ships, a Foundation-created type of jumpship which can perform faster-than-light travel without requiring a Spacer to navigate. When a mob of villagers arrives for the Imperials, Barr helps them escape and asks Riose to shoot him to death, so that he may avoid interrogation and torture. Riose kills Barr and flees.

== Bail Channis ==
In the Second Foundation (1953) story "Part I: Search by the Mule", the Mule has yet to find the elusive Second Foundation. He sends his agent Han Pritcher on his sixth search, this time accompanied Bail Channis, the only one of the Mule's followers who is "Unconverted", or not influenced by the Mule's psychic powers to serve him. The Mule tells Pritcher that Channis's untainted mind will allow him to be more capable of making intuitive leaps which might help in the search. In fact, the Mule has determined that Channis is a Second Foundation agent who intends to lead the Mule into a trap. Secretly followed by the Mule and his fleet, Channis leads the search to the desolate planet Tazenda, a plausible location for the Second Foundation. On a nearby world, Rossem, Pritcher draws his atomic blaster on Channis, who he now suspects to be an agent of the Second Foundation. Pritcher is correct, but Channis possesses a psychic ability similar to the Mule's and uses it to free Pritcher from the Mule's control. The Mule appears, and reveals that his fleet has destroyed Tazenda. The Mule uses mental torture to extract the true location of the Second Foundation from Channis's mind: Rossem. The First Speaker of the Second Foundation arrives and informs the Mule that he has been defeated. Channis had been preprogrammed to believe that the Second Foundation is on Rossem, but it is not. Second Foundation agents have traveled to Kalgan and the Foundation worlds to undo the Mule's Conversions and orchestrate an insurrection, and his fleet is too far away to prevent it. When the Mule experiences a moment of despair, the First Speaker is able to seize control of and alter his mind: he will return to Kalgan and live out the rest of his life as a peaceful despot. Channis's mind is later restored by the First Speaker.

Channis is voiced by Trader Faulkner in episode seven "The Mule Finds" of the 1973 radio adaptation The Foundation Trilogy.

== The Cleons ==
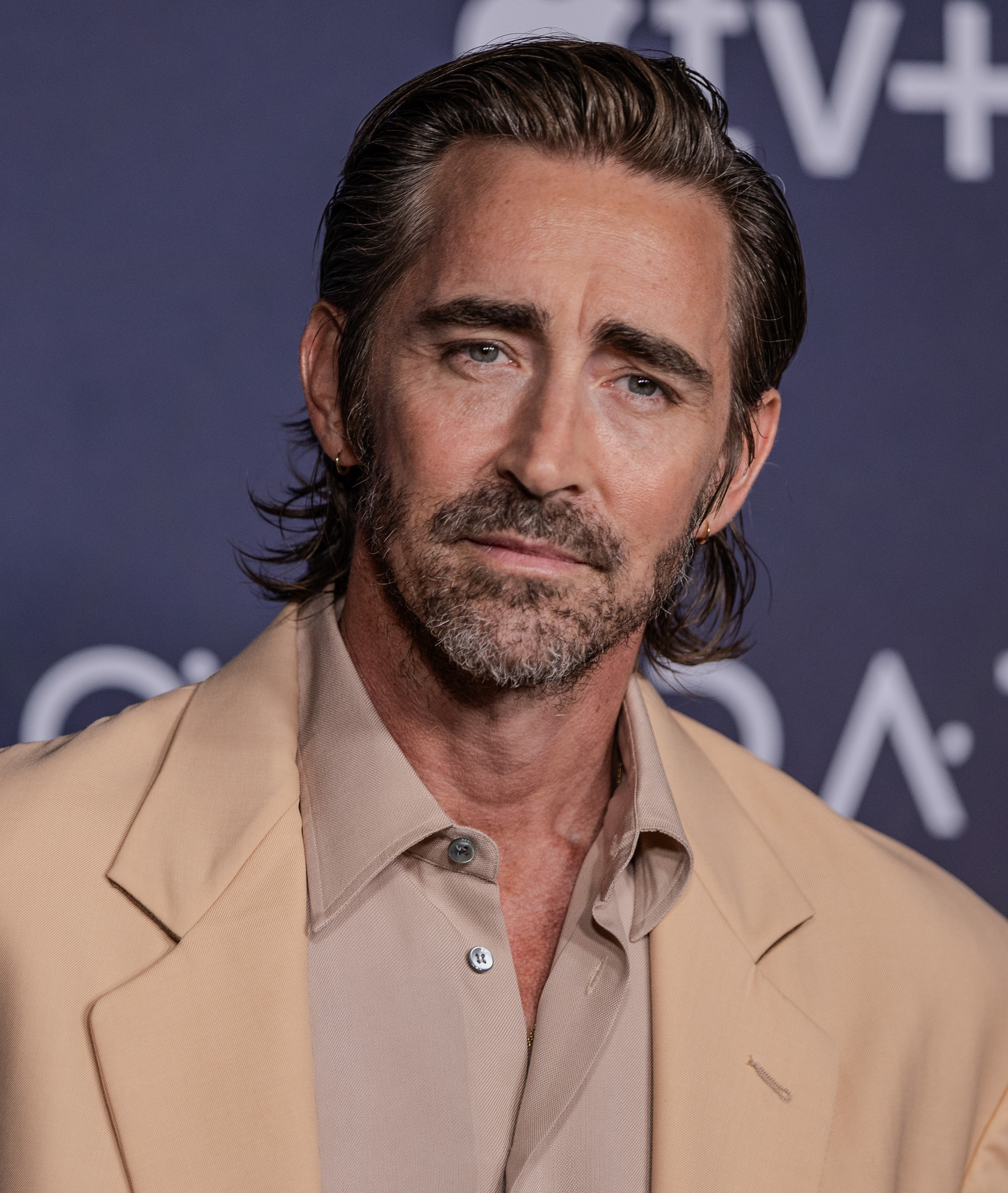
Lee Pace portrays Brother Day

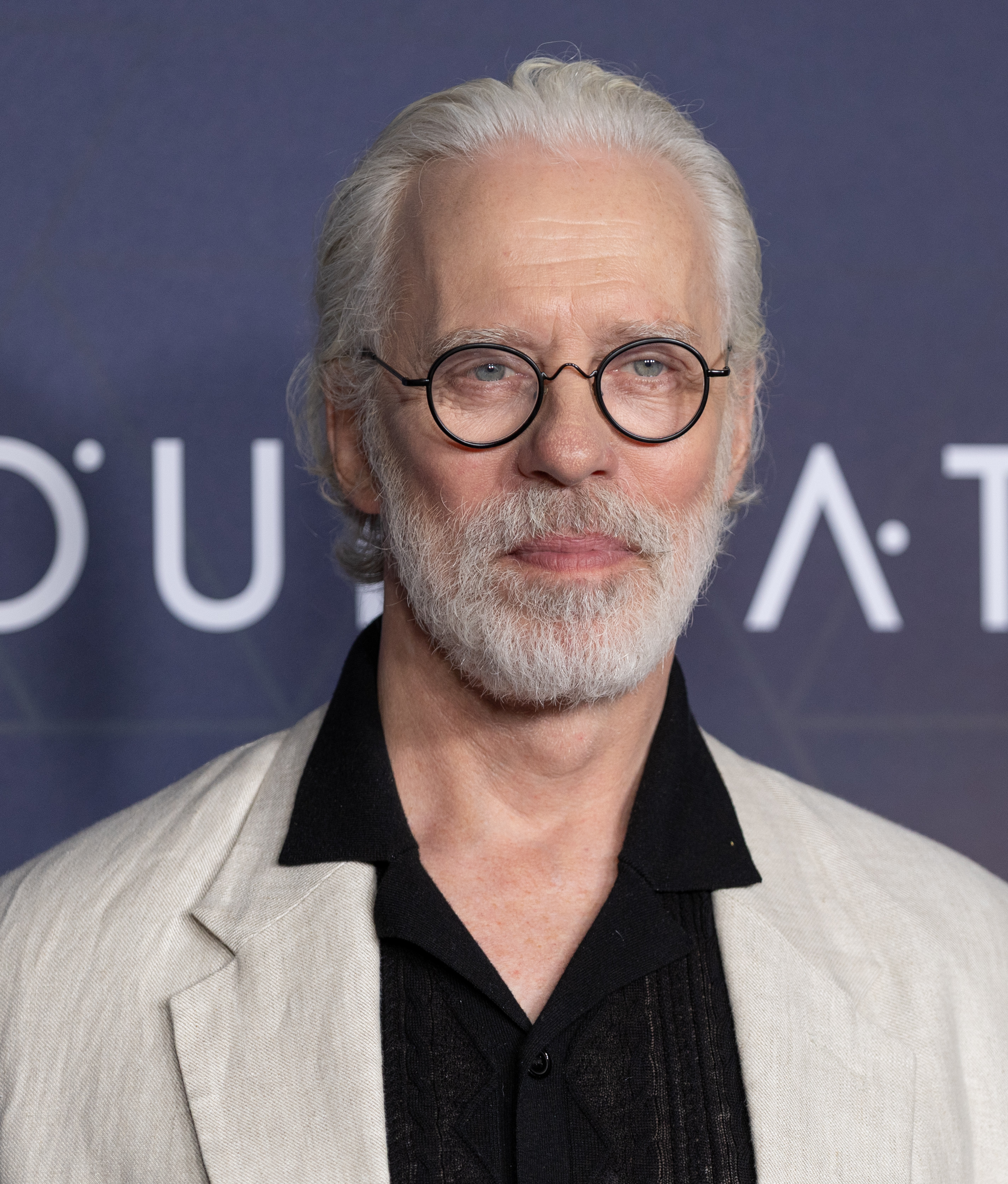
Terrence Mann portrays Brother Dusk

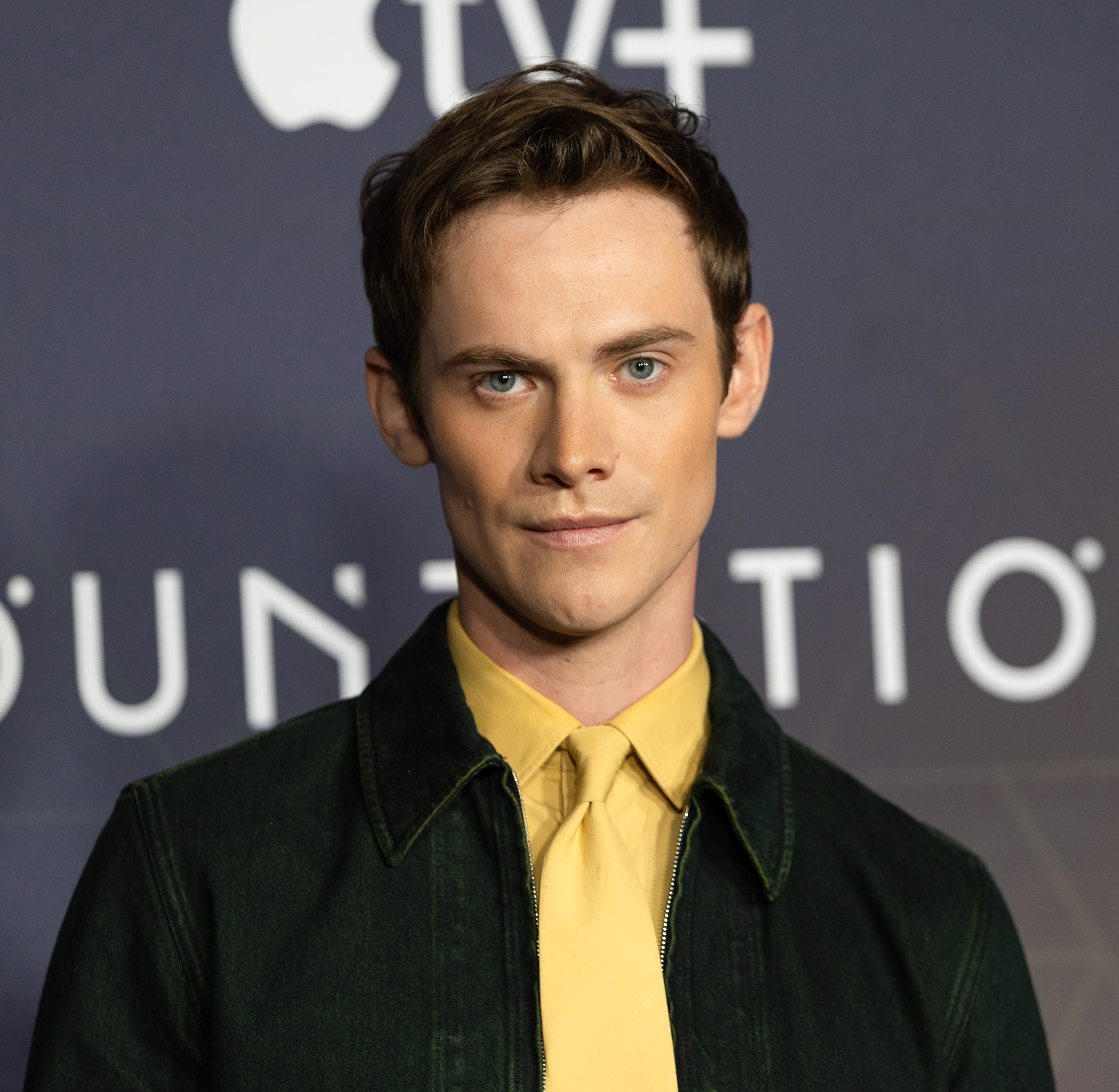
Cassian Bilton portrays Brother Dawn

Introduced in Foundation and Empire in "The General", Cleon II is the last great Emperor of the Galactic Empire. Threatened by the rising power and popularity of one of his own generals, Bel Riose, Cleon has him recalled and executed for treason. Wimmer and Wilkins described Cleon II as "the aging, infirmed emperor whose great mind has been let down by his faltering body." Nicholas David Gevers suggested that Cleon II is based on the Byzantine emperor Justinian I.

In the prequel novel Prelude to Foundation (1988), Emperor Cleon I learns of mathematician Hari Seldon's nascent concept of psychohistory, which might theoretically make it possible to predict the future. Brought before Cleon, Seldon emphasizes his belief that developing it as a science is likely impossible. Subsequently, interest in Seldon's work by unknown parties puts him in danger, convincing him of psychohistory's potential importance. Wimmer and Wilkens described Cleon as "basically decent but woefully inadequate" but also "a fairly entertaining character, who has me absolutely convinced that ruling a whole galaxy could be just a drag if you were born at the wrong time".

In Forward the Foundation (1993), Seldon and his foster son Raych thwart the scheme of populist Jo-Jo Joranum to become Cleon's First Minister and then overthrow him. The emperor subsequently appoints Seldon as his First Minister. Joranum's associate Gambol Deen Namarti's own plan to assassinate Seldon using a drugged Raych is also foiled, but Cleon is killed by a gardener trying to avoid promotion. A military government subsequently takes over, lasting for a decade.

In the 2021 television series adaptation Foundation, the 12,000-year-old Empire has been ruled for 400 years by a revolving trio of Cleon I clones: Brother Dusk (portrayed by Terrence Mann), a retired and aging Cleon who serves in an advisory role; Brother Day (portrayed by Lee Pace), a Cleon in his prime; and Brother Dawn (played by Cooper Carter as a child and Cassian Bilton as a young adult), a young Cleon being trained to succeed Brother Day. Though cloning does not factor in Asimov's novels, the television series introduces a "Genetic Dynasty", surreptitiously administered for centuries by the regal Lady Demerzel, secretly a unique, ageless robot.

Cleon II is voiced by William Fox in episode four, "The General", of the 1973 radio adaptation The Foundation Trilogy.

== Arcadia "Arkady" Darell ==
In the Second Foundation story "Part II: Search by the Foundation", Arcadia "Arkady" Darell is the 14-year-old daughter of Dr. Toran Darell II, and granddaughter of Bayta and Toran Darell. She has a keen sense of observation and deduction, and has learned that her Foundation member father is part of a cabal seeking the secret location of the Second Foundation. Arkady stows away with Foundation agent Homir Munn when he travels to the planet Kalgan to search for clues to the Second Foundation's location. Munn is rebuffed by Lord Stettin, the current warlord of Kalgan, but Arkady manipulates his flighty consort, Lady Callia, to persuade Stettin to allow librarian Munn access to the Mule's palace for research purposes. Stettin becomes suspicious of Munn and arrests him. Stettin also shows interest in marrying Arkady, and she escapes with help of Lady Callia. At the spaceport, Arkady meets trader Preem Palver and his wife, who help her flee the planet and take her to their home on Trantor. With Palver's help, Arkady sends a coded message to her father with what she has determined is the location of the Second Foundation. Dr. Darell invents a device which reveals several Second Foundation sleeper agents, and Arkady is tested to make sure she has not been compromised. Dr. Darell is relieved to find that the results are negative, not knowing that the Second Foundation did actually "adjust" Arkady shortly after birth, rendering their influence impossible to trace.

Wimmer and Wilkins described Arkady as "overconfident and impetuous, but witty and awfully smart for a kid." They wrote, "It's remarkable just how perfectly Asimov captures the occasionally obnoxious precociousness of the gifted teenager ... but he also folds in Arkady's romanticism and femininity without ever making them seem silly or stereotypical." Folk-Williams wrote that Arkady "is introduced with a lot of subtlety as a strong character, but she loses that depth and agency as the story unfolds. Like many others, she only has a moment in the story as she serves the needs of the plan, and then she's gone." Donald M. Hassler called Arkady the "concluding key figure" of the original Foundation trilogy. Wimmer and Wilkins praised her as "one of the best characters Asimov ever created", and one who belonged on "the short list for science fiction's all-time greatest heroes". However, they criticized Asimov' decision to have Arkady's mind tampered with, describing it as "callous and cold", and "an unnecessarily harsh ending for such a wonderful character."

Arkady is voiced by Sarar Frampton in episode eight "Star's End" of the 1973 radio adaptation The Foundation Trilogy.

== Bayta and Toran Darell ==
Bayta and Toran Darell are a newly married couple in the Foundation and Empire story "The Mule". Bayta, a descendant of a great Foundation family, and Toran, who is part of a Trader family, learn that a mysterious figure called the Mule has conquered the barbarian planet Kalgan with no military force and no resistance from the Kalganians. The Darells investigate, but soon leave Kalgan with the fugitive Magnifico, a "strange, gangly creature" who is the Mule's former court jester. On Terminus, they seek out elder Foundation scholar Ebling Mis for advice. The complacent Mayor Indbur of Terminus is nonplussed about the danger posed by the Mule, believing that the pending hologram from Hari Seldon will tell them how to handle this latest crisis. Instead, Seldon predicts a civil war between the Foundation and the Traders. The Mule's forces arrive, and Indbur surrenders immediately. The Darells escape with Mis and Magnifico to find the rumored Second Foundation, their only hope to stop the Mule. At what remains of the Great Library of Trantor, Mis works tirelessly to discover clues to the secret location of the Second Foundation. Dying, Mis announces that he knows where the Second Foundation is. Bayta kills him before he can reveal the location, having just realized that Magnifico is the Mule, who seeks the Second Foundation so he can destroy it. He is a mutant who can sense and manipulate the emotions of others, an ability he has employed to conquer planets bloodlessly, and to compel Mis to work himself to death. The only person the Mule has not manipulated emotionally is Bayta, because she had genuinely cared for the lonely Magnifico.

The Mule promises to find and destroy the Second Foundation, the only threat to his eventual reign over the entire galaxy, but Bayta asserts that it has already prepared for him, and will react before he has time to stop it.

John Folk-Williams described Bayta as "the real star of this story, a fairly well realized female character who is considerably smarter and more observant than her young husband and who often carries the burden of explaining what's going on to her less aware companions." He noted that the final chapters "give Bayta the central role in seeing through the Mule's special powers of mind". Wimmer and Wilkins called Bayta "a very different type of character from anyone who has previously appeared in Foundation". They noted that she is only the second female character to appear in any Foundation story, and Folk-Williams deemed Bayta "one of Asimov's better attempts at a woman character".

Wimmer and Wilkins explained that the Mule subtly controls the emotions of everyone in the story except for Bayta, "the sole person in the entire galaxy who, of her own volition, treated him like a person ... and that of course was his undoing." Noting that the Mule's psychic manipulations "subtly made Toran Darell far braver and far stupider than he really was", Wimmer and Wilkins wrote that "it feels weird to know that a key character like Toran wasn't acting himself throughout most of the story."

Bayta is voiced by Angela Pleasence and Toran by Gary Watson in episode five "The Mule" and episode six "Flight from the Mule" of the 1973 radio adaptation The Foundation Trilogy.

In March 2024, Apple TV+ announced that Synnøve Karlsen and Cody Fern had been cast as "Bayta and Toran Mallow" for season three of the 2021 television series adaptation Foundation.

== Eto Demerzel ==
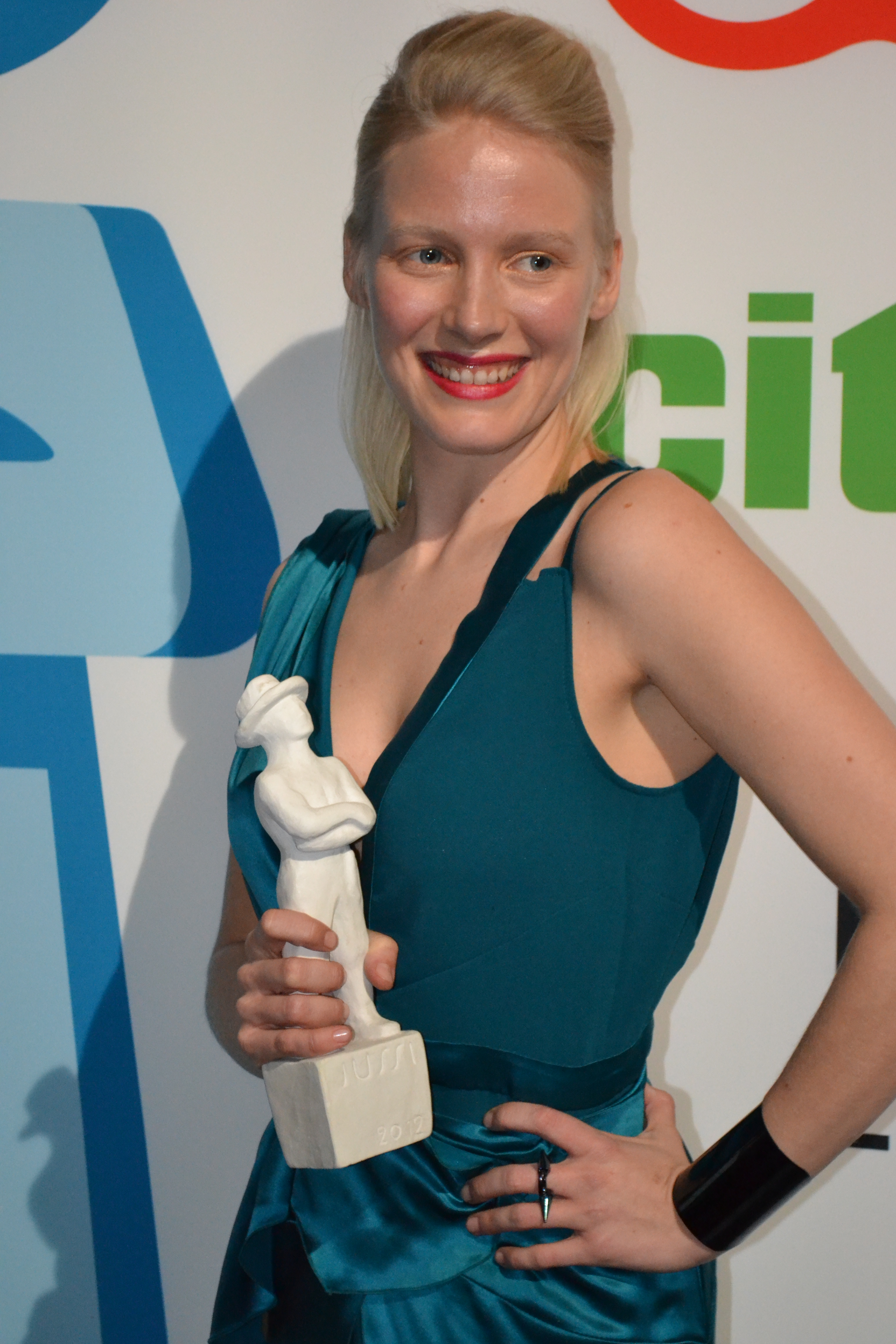
Laura Birn portrays Lady Demerzel in the 2021 TV series.

In Prelude to Foundation, reporter Chetter Hummin warns young mathematician Hari Seldon that his nascent theory of psychohistory has attracted the dangerous attention of Eto Demerzel, the First Minister and chief advisor to Emperor Cleon I. Pairing Seldon with Streeling University historian Dors Venabili, Hummin assists him in his danger-fraught tour of several of Trantor's 800 varied sectors, evading capture by Demerzel while gathering information he hopes will inform if and how psychohistory can be developed into a predictive science. Hummin is revealed to be Demerzel, who has seen the importance of psychohistory to humanity's future and has manipulated Seldon to help him bring it to fruition. Seldon confronts Demerzel with his determination that the First Minister is a robot. Demerzel confirms that he is one of the last surviving robots from the Robot Wars, R. Daneel Olivaw, a prominent character in Asimov's Robot series. He has been guiding human development for centuries, and needs psychohistory to hopefully mitigate the anarchy that will be precipitated by the inevitable and imminent fall of the Empire. Thanks to Demerzel's guidance, Seldon has realized that Trantor itself possesses the diversity and complexity, at a manageable scale, required to build his calculations. James E. Gunn compared Seldon's revelation that Demerzel is a robot to the sequence in the 1933 novel Lost Horizon in which Hugh Conway guesses correctly that the High Lama is the 250-year-old monk Perrault. Wimmer and Wilkens described Demerzel as scheming and mysterious, and Hummin as "impossibly well-connected", adding "there's a lot of fun to be had with Hummin and Demerzel's attempts to pass convincingly as humans."

In Forward the Foundation, ambitious politician Jo-Jo Joranum schemes to replace Demerzel as First Minister, with the goal of ultimately deposing Cleon I. Realizing the danger, Seldon has his foster son Raych "reveal" that Demerzel is a robot. Joranum accuses Demerzel, who seemingly proves himself to not be a robot by laughing, as a human would. A humiliated Joranum is exiled to a distant planet. Demerzel subsequently steps down to focus his efforts elsewhere in the universe, and Cleon appoints Seldon as his First Minister.

A gender-swapped and expanded version of the character is portrayed by Laura Birn in the 2021 television series adaptation Foundation. This Lady Demerzel is majordomo to the revolving trio of Emperor clones, Brothers Dawn, Day and Dusk. Only the emperors themselves are aware that Demerzel is secretly an ageless robot, the last surviving gynoid from the ancient Robot Wars. Rafael Motamayor of Vulture wrote, "Demerzel is Foundation's biggest secret weapon—a character the show is mostly keeping a mystery while slowly unraveling just how central to every aspect of the story she really is."

== Lathan Devers ==
In the Foundation and Empire story "The General", Foundation trader Lathan Devers lets himself be captured by Imperial General Bel Riose to disrupt Riose's overtures against the Foundation from the inside. With Emperor Cleon II's Privy Secretary Ammel Brodrig present to observe Riose, Devers attempts to implicate Riose in a nonexistent attempt to overthrow Cleon. His machinations are exposed, but Ducem Barr helps him escape further interrogation by knocking Riose unconscious and fleeing the planet with Devers in tow. They travel to the Imperial capital planet, Trantor, and plot to influence Cleon directly with Devers' invented conspiracy, implicating both Riose and Brodrig. Though they are caught by the Secret Police, they escape and later learn that Riose and Brodrig have been arrested for treason and executed.

Wimmer and Wilkins wrote of the character, "Devers clearly wants to be in the mold of the larger-than-life characters we met in Foundation, but he lacks the cunning of a Salvor Hardin or a Hober Mallow. What's worse, Devers is the best the Foundation's got—he's an above-average man living in an era of mediocrity going up against the Empire's last great men."

Devers is voiced by Michael Harbour in episode four "The General" of the 1973 radio adaptation The Foundation Trilogy.

== Gaal Dornick ==
Introduced in Foundation in the story "The Psychohistorians", Gaal Dornick is a gifted young mathematician, newly awarded his doctorate, who has been invited to the Imperial capital planet Trantor from his home planet Synnax by famed mathematician and psychologist Hari Seldon. Seldon has developed the science of psychohistory, which uses sophisticated mathematics and statistical analysis to predict future trends on a galactic scale. Knowing that Dornick is possibly the only person in the galaxy capable of fully understanding his work, Seldon reveals his prediction of the unavoidable and relatively imminent fall of the Galactic Empire. He has conceived a plan, in which Dornick's participation is crucial, to mitigate the duration of this societal collapse. Under surveillance by agents of the Committee of Public Safety since his arrival, Dornick is arrested and interrogated. As orchestrated by Seldon, he and his followers are exiled to the distant planet Terminus, where he intends to execute this plan by establishing the Foundation. Describing "The Psychohistorians" as "28 pages of nonstop world-building", Wimmer and Wilkins note that "the ostensible protagonist, Gaal Dornick, is such a non-entity that he barely even counts as an audience identification figure".

Dornick is voiced by Geoffrey Beevers in episode one "Psychohistory and Encyclopedia" of the 1973 radio adaptation The Foundation Trilogy.

A gender-swapped and expanded version of Dornick is portrayed by Lou Llobell in the 2021 television series adaptation Foundation. She is a mathematical prodigy from an ocean world where science and mathematics are considered heresy, and forbidden.

== Salvor Hardin ==
Introduced in Foundation in the story "The Encyclopedists", Salvor Hardin is the first mayor of Terminus City, the primary settlement on Terminus. Hardin believes Terminus is in danger of political exploitation by the four neighboring prefectures of the Empire. Identifying the kingdom of Anacreon as the most powerful of the four, Hardin visits the others and convinces them that they must resist nuclear power from falling to Anacreon alone. The three issue a joint ultimatum that all be allowed to receive nuclear technology from Terminus City, ensuring that the Foundation is indispensable to all.

In "The Mayors", Anacreon launches a direct military assault against Terminus using an abandoned Imperial battlecruiser. Hardin secretly installs a kill switch into the cruiser, causing the crew to mutiny. Maddened by this failure, Prince Regent Wienis of Anacreon orders Hardin's execution, but his royal guardsmen refuse to obey him. He then attempts, but fails, to kill Hardin himself.

Hardin is voiced by Lee Montague in episode two "The Mayors" of the 1973 radio adaptation The Foundation Trilogy.

A gender-swapped version of Hardin is portrayed by Leah Harvey in the 2021 television series adaptation Foundation. She is the Warden and protector of Terminus, 35 years after Seldon's trial.

== Hober Mallow ==
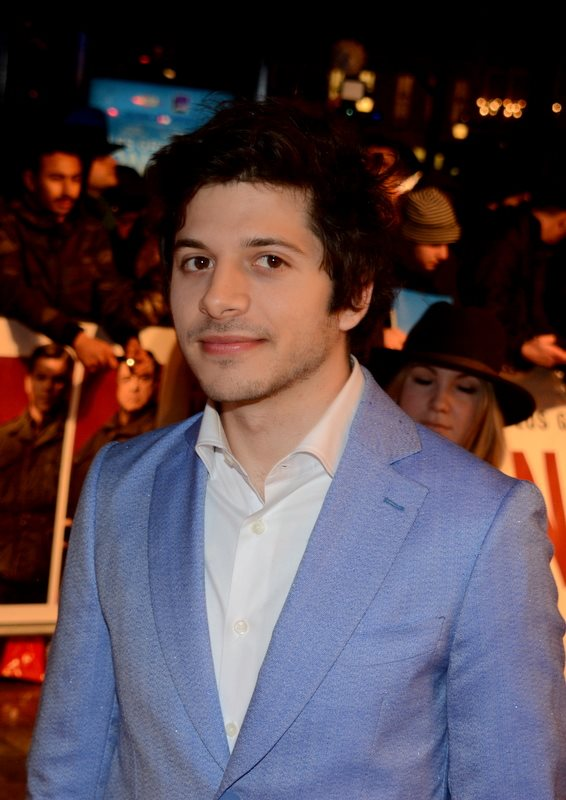
Dimitri Leonidas portrays Hober Mallow in the 2021 TV series.

Introduced in Foundation in the story "The Merchant Princes", Hober Mallow is a Master Trader for the Foundation. He and his ship, Far Star, are sent to Korell to investigate the disappearance of three Foundation vessels in the vicinity. A Foundation missionary, Reverend Jord Parma, seeks sanctuary, but Mallow suspects subterfuge and turns Parma over to the Korellians, whose laws forbid Foundation missionaries to be on the planet under penalty of death. Mallow negotiates the sale of Foundation devices to the ruler of Korell, and soon the planet is dependent on them. Mallow is later tried for murder on Terminus for condemning the missionary to death, but is exonerated when he proves that Parma was actually an agent of the Korellian secret police. Mallow's popularity results in his appointment to Mayor of Terminus. Korell subsequently declares war on the Foundation, and when Mallow imposes an embargo on them, the Korellan economy collapses due to its dependency on Foundation technology, thus forcing its surrender. Wimmer and Wilkins described Mallow as "larger-than-life", and "one of the strangest characters Asimov ever created, a heartless bastard who's described physically more like a particularly intelligent shaved bear than a normal human."

Mallow is voiced by Julian Glover as in episode three "The Merchant Princes" of the 1973 radio adaptation The Foundation Trilogy.

Mallow is portrayed by Dimitri Leonidas in season two of the 2021 television series adaptation Foundation. He is a roguish trader and con man with a "sarcastic personality and questionable morals, who is summoned against his will to serve a higher, selfless cause." In Season 3, the Darell family is rewritten as his descendants, including changing their surname to Mallow.

== Ebling Mis ==
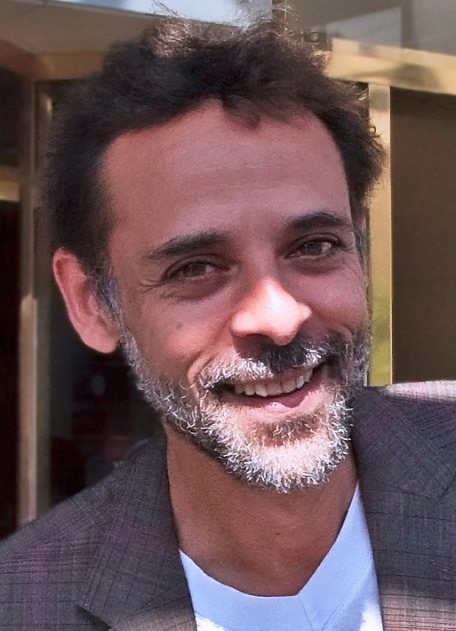
Alexander Siddig portrays Ebling Mis in the 2021 TV series.

In the Foundation and Empire story "The Mule", Ebling Mis is the Foundation's first real psychologist since its founding. He is warned by Bayta and Toran Darell about the Mule, a mysterious figure who has conquered the planet Kalgan and is planning to do the same to other worlds. Mis tries to warn Mayor Indbur of Terminus of the danger posed by the Mule, but is rebuffed. The Foundation soon falls to the Mule, and Mis flees with the Darells and Magnifico, the Mule's former jester, to find the rumored Second Foundation and seek their aid. At what remains of the Great Library of Trantor, Mis works tirelessly to discover clues to the secret location of the Second Foundation. Dying, Mis announces that he knows where the Second Foundation is. Bayta kills him before he can reveal the location, having just realized that Magnifico is the Mule, who seeks the Second Foundation so he can destroy it. He is a mutant who can sense and manipulate the emotions of others, an ability he has employed to conquer planets bloodlessly, and to compel Mis to work himself to death. The Mule promises to find and destroy the Second Foundation, the only threat to his eventual reign over the entire galaxy.

Wimmer and Wilkins called Mis "the liveliest character of the series since Salvor Hardin", and described him as "so deliberately over-the-top—and so fun to read because of it ... he's like one of Heinlein's classic old men, Jubal Harshaw or Lazarus Long, with a heaping dash of comic outrageousness that wouldn't work in Stranger in a Strange Land or Time Enough for Love (they're too ponderous) but fits perfectly in the slightly cartoonish universe of the Foundation." They also remarked on the "brutality" of the "compulsive gradual suicide" visited upon Mis by the Mule, and called the character's death at Bayta's hands "a horrifying moment". Wimmer and Wilkins wrote that "Mis is on the verge of unwittingly selling out everything he's ever lived for, forcing a dear and innocent friend to destroy him". They argued, "[Mis's] death really does signal the end of the Foundation as we have come to know it. Up till that moment, things have still felt a bit like a game ... the Mule might have taken over Terminus and Haven, but there's little sense of any enormous casualties. You feel like, heck, maybe even if he did win, things wouldn't be so awful ... and then Mis is gone, and in a manner as ugly and unhappy as anyone could imagine ... it hits home just how awful things are, just how terribly the Mule has disturbed the order of things."

Mis is voiced by Maurice Denham in episode five "The Mule" and episode six "Flight from the Mule" of the 1973 radio adaptation The Foundation Trilogy.

Mis is portrayed by Alexander Siddig in season three of the 2021 television series adaptation Foundation. The character is described as a "self-taught psychohistorian and diehard fan of Hari Seldon."

== The Mule ==
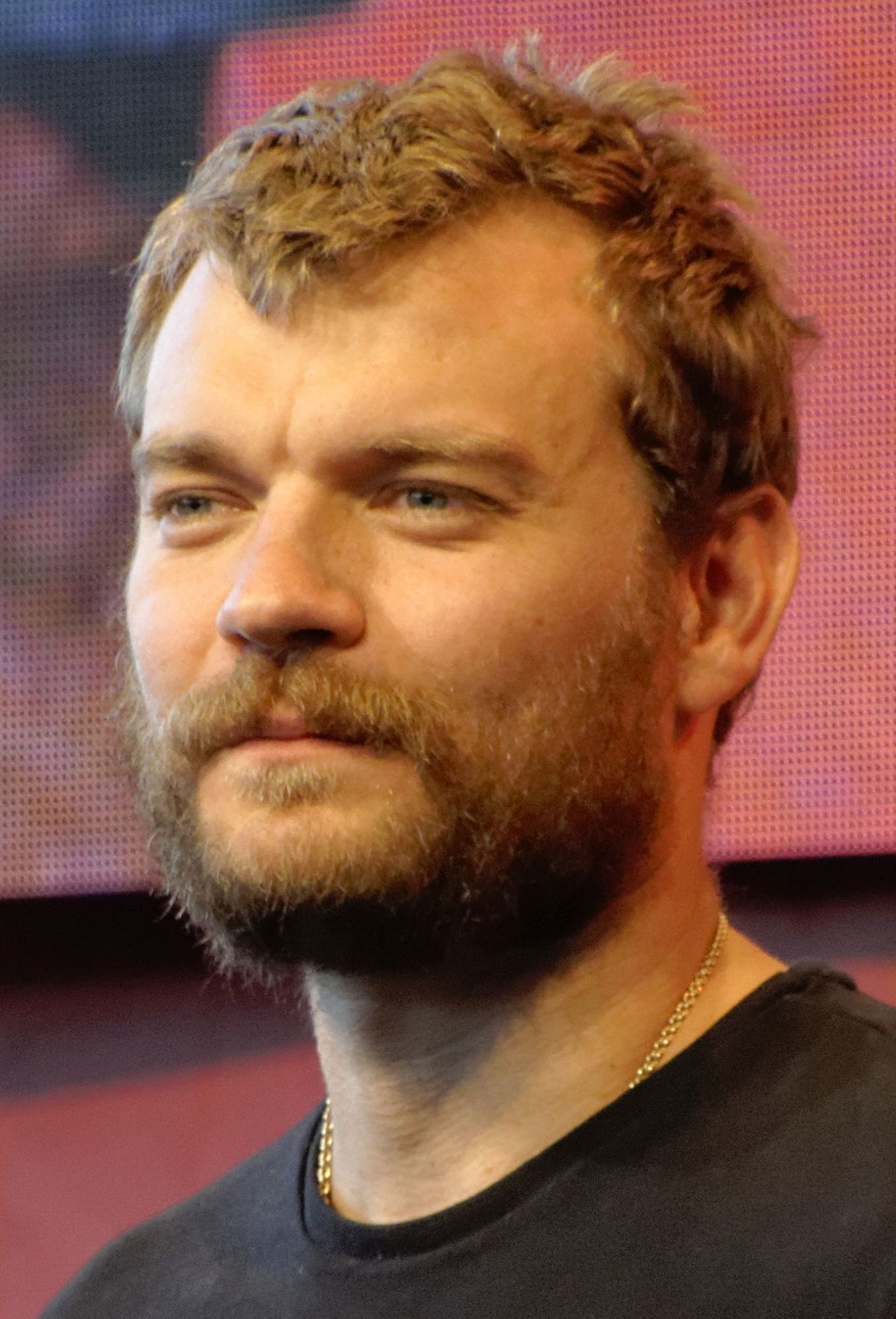
Pilou Asbæk portrays the Mule in season three.

In the Foundation and Empire story "The Mule", a mysterious figure called the Mule has conquered the planet Kalgan with no military force and no resistance from the Kalganians. Foundation-aligned newlyweds Bayta and Toran Darell leave Kalgan with the Mule's fugitive court jester, Magnifico Giganticus, and soon the Foundation falls to the Mule as well. The Darells and elder Foundation scholar Ebling Mis escape with Magnifico to find the rumored Second Foundation, their only hope to stop the Mule. After tireless research, a dying Mis announces that he knows where the Second Foundation is. Bayta kills him before he can reveal the location, having just realized that Magnifico is the Mule, who seeks the Second Foundation so he can destroy it. He is a mutant who can sense and manipulate the emotions of others, an ability he has employed to conquer planets bloodlessly, to "Convert" Foundation intelligence officer Han Pritcher into a loyal agent, and to compel Mis to work himself to death. The Mule promises to find and destroy the Second Foundation, the only threat to his eventual reign over the entire galaxy.

The Second Foundation story "Part I: Search by the Mule" finds the Mule still searching for the elusive Second Foundation. Pritcher is accompanied on his latest search by Bail Channis, a follower of the Mule who remains "Unconverted" by the Mule's psychic powers and who the Mule suspects is a Second Foundation agent. Pritcher deduces that Channis is a spy, but Channis possesses a psychic ability similar to the Mule's and uses it to free Pritcher from the Mule's control. The Mule appears and uses mental torture to extract the true location of the Second Foundation from Channis's mind, but the First Speaker of the Second Foundation arrives and informs the Mule that he has been defeated. While the Mule has been focused on Channis, Second Foundation agents have traveled to Kalgan and the Foundation worlds to undo the Mule's Conversions and orchestrate an insurrection, and his fleet is too far away to prevent it. When the Mule experiences a moment of despair, the First Speaker is able to seize control of and alter his mind: he will return to Kalgan and live out the rest of his life as a peaceful despot.

Magnifico/The Mule is voiced by Wolfe Morris in episodes five, six and seven of the 1973 radio adaptation The Foundation Trilogy.

The Mule is portrayed by Mikael Persbrandt in season two of the 2021 television series adaptation Foundation. Decider called the introduction of the Mule "one of the show's most long-awaited moments". The role was recast with Pilou Asbæk for season three. Additionally, Magnifico is portrayed by Tómas Lemarquis.

== Preem Palver ==
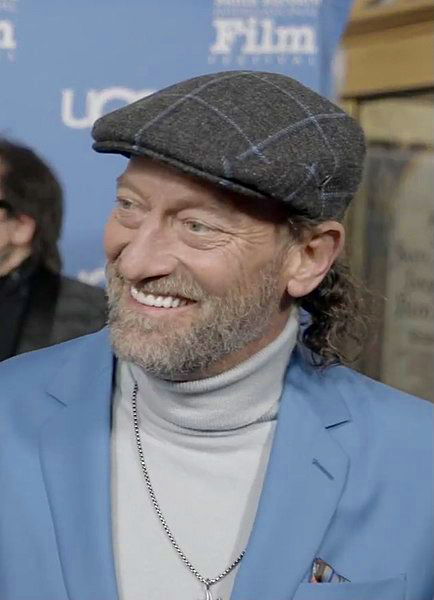
Troy Kotsur portrays Preem Palver in the 2021 TV series.

In the Second Foundation story "Part II: Search by the Foundation", farmer and trader Preem Palver and his wife are at the spaceport on Kalgan when they meet teenager Arkady Darell. Arkady is fleeing Lord Stettin, the warlord of Kalgan, so the Palvers take her with them to their home on Trantor. Palver later helps Arkady send a coded message to her father, Dr. Toran Darell II of the Foundation, containing what she believes is the location of the Second Foundation. Stettin launches an invasion of the Foundation which fails, and the discovery of several Second Foundation sleeper agents convinces the Foundation that they have eliminated the threat of the Second Foundation. Palver, however, is secretly the First Speaker of the intact Second Foundation, and has orchestrated Stettin's attack, its failure, the discovery of Palver's own agents and even Arkady's participation to convince the Foundation that they have triumphed.

Palver is voiced by Cyril Shaps in episode seven "The Mule Finds" and episode eight "Star's End" of the 1973 radio adaptation The Foundation Trilogy.

Palver is portrayed by Troy Kotsur in season three of the 2021 television series adaptation Foundation. The character is described as "the leader of a planet of psychics."

== Lewis Pirenne ==
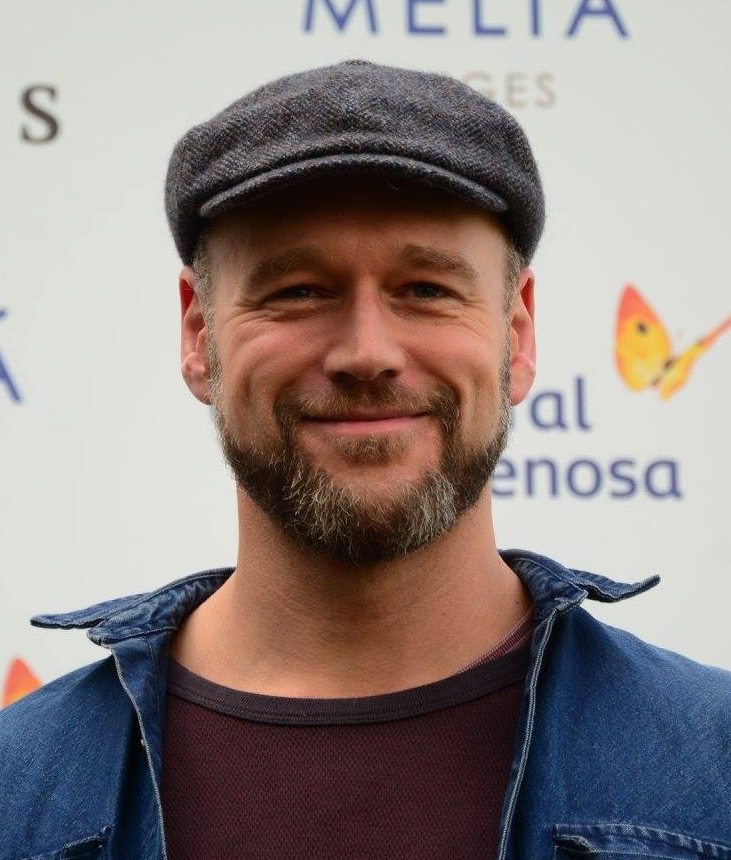
Elliot Cowan portrays Lewis Pirenne in the 2021 TV series.

Introduced in Foundation in the story "The Encyclopedists", Dr. Lewis Pirenne is the chairman of the Foundation's Board of Trustees and the leader of the Encyclopedists. He dismisses Mayor Salvor Hardin's concerns about the Foundation's susceptibility to interference by nearby regimes, believing that their focus should be on creating the Encyclopedia Galactica and not local politics. When Hari Seldon's Time Vault opens and Seldon reveals that the encyclopedia was merely an excuse to establish the Foundation away from Imperial control, Pirenne realizes that he was wrong and cedes leadership of the Foundation to Hardin.

Book Analysis and Shmoop explained that Pirenne is rigid and resistant to change, which is ultimately in conflict with Seldon's Plan. Wimmer and Wilkins described Pirenne as a "useless twit".

Pirenne is voiced by Roy Spencer in episode one "Psychohistory and Encyclopedia" of the 1973 radio adaptation The Foundation Trilogy.

Pirenne is portrayed by Elliot Cowan in season one of the 2021 television series adaptation Foundation. He is the Director of the Foundation and first successor of Hari Seldon, and comes into conflict with Salvor Hardin over how to handle the arrival of the Anacreons to Terminus.

== Han Pritcher ==
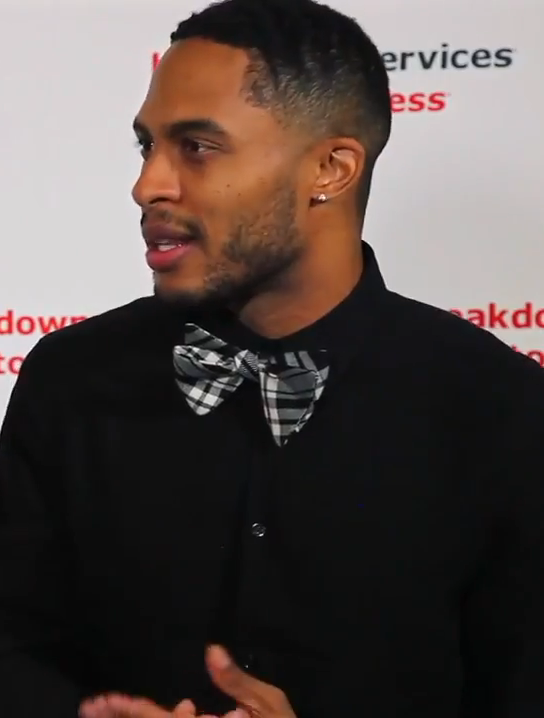
Brandon P. Bell portrays Han Pritcher in season three of the 2021 TV series.

In the Foundation and Empire story "The Mule", Han Pritcher is a Foundation intelligence officer and secretly a member of the Democratic Underground on Terminus, planning to overthrow Mayor Indbur. Though ordered by the Mayor to investigate renegade traders, he instead looks into the sudden takeover of the planet Kalgan by the Mule. Pritcher attempts to assassinate the Mule in a suicide attack to thwart his conquest of the Foundation, but the Mule is a mutant and uses his psychic powers to "Convert" Pritcher into one of his most loyal followers.

In the Second Foundation story "Part I: Search by the Mule", the Mule has yet to find the elusive Second Foundation. He sends Pritcher on his sixth search, this time accompanied by Bail Channis, the only one of the Mule's followers who is "Unconverted", or not influenced by the Mule's psychic powers to serve him. The Mule tells Pritcher this will be an advantage to their quest, but he actually believes that Channis is a Second Foundation agent who intends to lead the Mule into a trap. Secretly followed by the Mule and his fleet, Channis leads the search to the desolate planet Rossem. Pritcher draws his atomic blaster on Channis, who he now suspects to be an agent of the Second Foundation. Pritcher is correct, but Channis possesses a psychic ability similar to the Mule's and uses it to free Pritcher from the Mule's control. The Mule appears, but while he has been focused on Channis, the Second Foundation has orchestrated an insurrection on Kalgan, and his fleet is too far away to prevent it. When the Mule experiences a moment of despair, the First Speaker of the Second Foundation is able to seize control of and alter his mind: he will return to Kalgan and live out the rest of his life as a peaceful despot. Pritcher joins him.

Wimmer and Wilkins wrote of Pritcher, "He breaks rules without a second thought ... but his code of honor forces him to be as honest about it as he possibly can. Before defying his orders, he tries to work through the appropriate official channels, even though he knows it's futile." Charles Papadopoulos of Screen Rant described Pritcher as one of Asimov's more complex characters, noting that "due to his rebellious nature, he's constantly at odds with his overseers ... He's also crucially part of an underground group looking to rebel against the Foundation's leadership." Wimmer and Wilkins described Pritcher's final Conversion by the Mule as "crushing", writing that "more than any other character in this story, Pritcher was an individual, and it's so sad to see him reduced to a puppet of the Mule, albeit still a charming and unconventional one." Wimmer and Wilkins wrote that the Converted version of the character in "Search by the Mule" is "a tricky protagonist to really connect with" due to "a lot of second derivative characterization".

Pritcher is voiced by John Justin in episodes five, six and seven of the 1973 radio adaptation The Foundation Trilogy.

Pritcher is portrayed by Brandon P. Bell in season three of the 2021 television series adaptation Foundation.

== Bel Riose ==
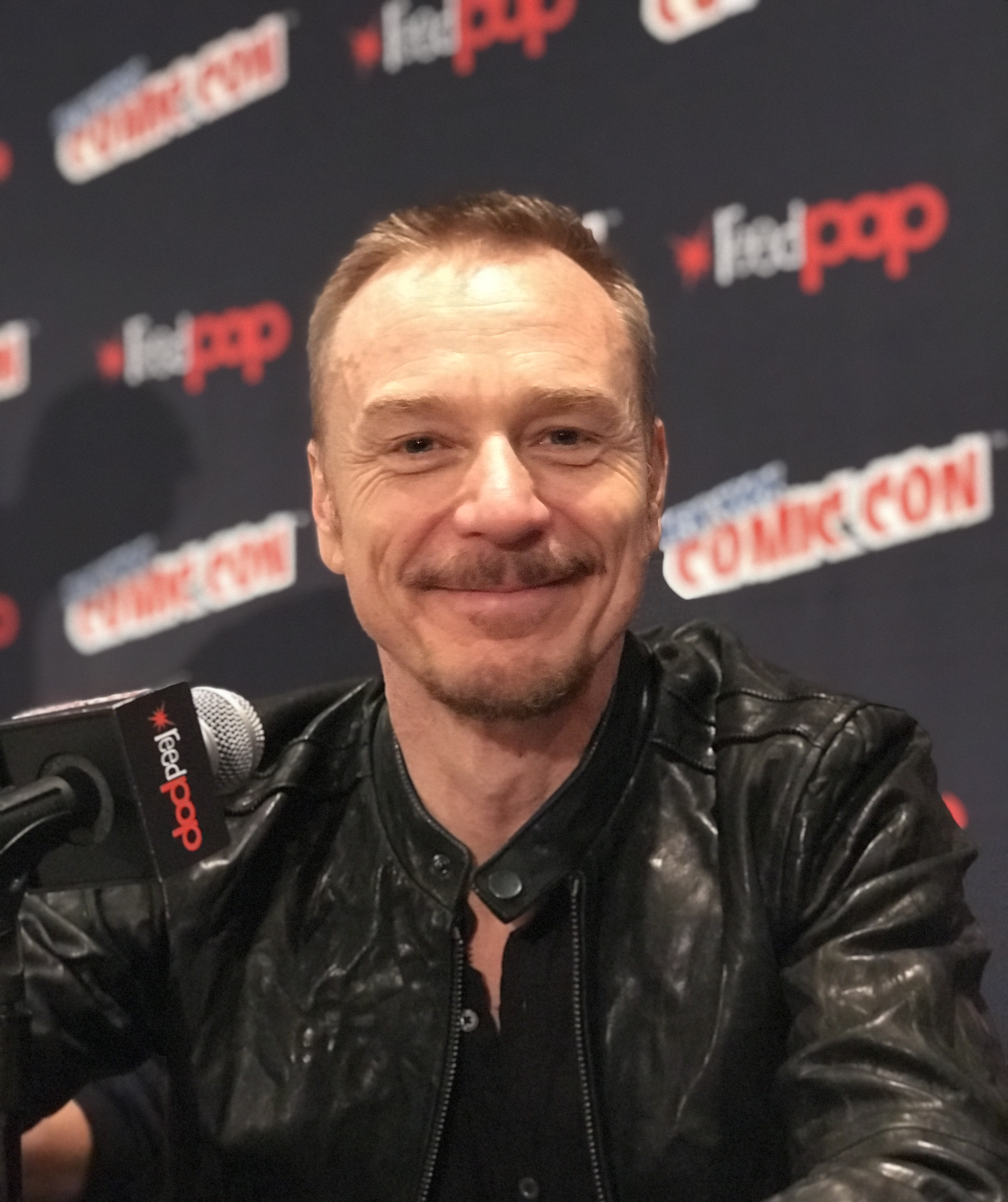
Ben Daniels portrays Bel Riose in the 2021 TV series.

In the Foundation and Empire story "The General", Imperial General Bel Riose governs the planet Siwenna. He investigates the Foundation and is soon determined to destroy it, both as a perceived threat to the Empire and to further his own ambitions. Foundation trader Lathan Devers lets himself be captured by Riose to disrupt his overtures against the Foundation from the inside. With Emperor Cleon II's Privy Secretary Ammel Brodrig present to observe Riose, Devers attempts to implicate Riose in a nonexistent attempt to overthrow Cleon. His machinations are exposed, but Ducem Barr, a Foundation sympathizer forced to aid Riose, helps him escape further interrogation by knocking Riose unconscious and fleeing the planet with Devers in tow. They travel to the Imperial capital planet, Trantor, and plot to influence Cleon directly with Devers' invented conspiracy, implicating both Riose and Brodrig. Though they are caught by the Secret Police, they escape and later learn that Riose and Brodrig have been arrested for treason and executed. Asimov later explains the political dynamics of why Riose would never have been able to defeat the Foundation: a strong emperor's sense of self-preservation would never allow him to tolerate a subordinate who develops potentially threatening power. Riose is loosely based on Belisarius, a great general of the Roman Empire who served Justinian I during the 6th century AD.

Riose is voiced by Dinsdale Landen in episode four "The General" of the 1973 radio adaptation The Foundation Trilogy.

Riose is portrayed by Ben Daniels in season two of the 2021 television series adaptation Foundation. He is the last great general of the Superliminal Fleet, imprisoned by Emperor Cleon for breaking orders to save troops, despite still achieving a victory. In exchange for his freedom and a reunion with his husband, Glawen Curr, Riose agrees to investigate the dissident Foundation on behalf of the Empire.

== Hari Seldon ==
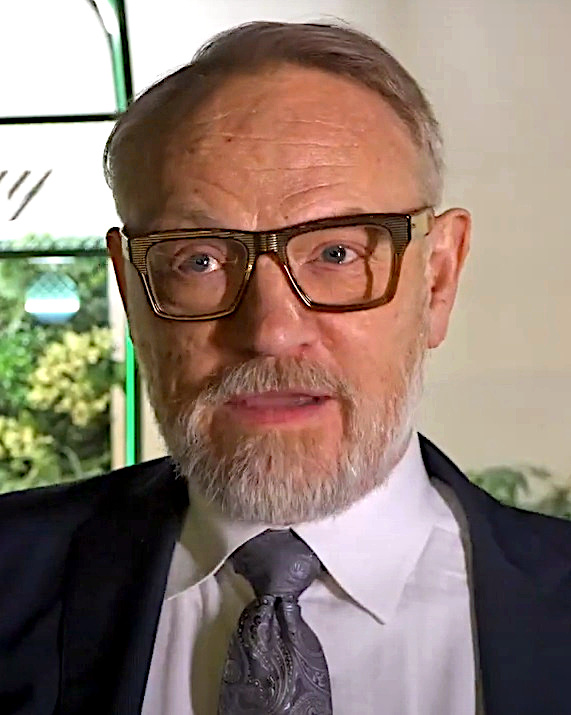
Jared Harris portrays Hari Seldon in the 2021 TV series.

Introduced in Foundation in "The Psychohistorians", famed mathematician and psychologist Hari Seldon has developed the science of psychohistory, which uses sophisticated mathematics and statistical analysis to predict future trends on a galactic scale. He has predicted the unavoidable and relatively imminent fall of the Galactic Empire, which will spark a Dark Age lasting 30,000 years. Seldon has conceived a plan which, by his calculations, will limit this interregnum to 1,000 years. He orchestrates his own trial by the Commission of Public Safety, the ruling body of the Empire, who are displeased with his predictions and the potential chaos they would incite. As Seldon anticipated, the Commission does not want to martyr him, so he and his 100,000 followers are exiled from Trantor, the center of the Empire, to the distant and nearly uninhabitable planet Terminus. There Seldon intends to establish the Foundation, "a repository of crucial, civilization-preserving knowledge" that will enable society to revive itself more quickly and efficiently. Describing "The Psychohistorians" as "28 pages of nonstop world-building", Wimmer and Wilkins wrote that in the story, "Hari Seldon isn't so much a character as he is the living embodiment of psychohistory, an ethereal presence who's about as relatable as Gandalf. It wouldn't be until Prelude to Foundation ... that Seldon would become an actual character."

Seldon is voiced by William Eedle in several episodes of the 1973 radio adaptation The Foundation Trilogy.

Seldon is portrayed by Jared Harris in the 2021 television series adaptation Foundation.

== Dors Venabili ==
In Prelude to Foundation, reporter Chetter Hummin introduces young mathematician Hari Seldon to Streeling University historian Dors Venabili, who subsequently joins Seldon in his danger-fraught tour of several of Trantor's 800 varied sectors. Seldon is gathering information he hopes will inform if and how his nascent theory of psychohistory can be developed into a predictive science. He realizes that Trantor itself possesses the diversity and complexity, at a manageable scale, required to build his calculations. But he also requires the emotional support of Venabili, and he does not care that she may also be a robot.

In Forward the Foundation, Seldon and Venabili have married, and adopted the former street urchin Raych. But their relationship is strained, and they continue to grow apart. Venabili begins an investigation centered on the Electro-Clarifier, a new device co-invented by Tamwile Elar and built by Cinda Moray, which enhances the abilities of Seldon's Prime Radiant. Venabili believes the Electro-Clarifier is aging Seldon and Yugo Amaryl prematurely.

She instead discovers it is actually killing her, because it only affects the positronic brains of robots. She finally admits to Seldon that she is a robot, and having killed Elar to protect him, reveals that the combination of the device's effects and breaking the First Law of Robotics by harming a human has caused irreparable damage. Dying, she tells Seldon that his love made her human.

Wimmer and Wilkins wrote that though Venabili's death delivered "a genuine sense of tragedy ... Dors was a hard character to get a fix on—there was always a faint coldness about her".

== Poly Verisof ==
Introduced in Foundation in the story "The Mayors", Poly Verisof is the Foundation ambassador and High Priest on Anacreon. After Salvor Hardin discovers a plot against him orchestrated by Prince Regent Wienis, he employs the aid of Verisof, who uses his mass following to instigate a mob against Wienis that helps assure Hardin's victory.

Wimmer and Wilkins wrote that though Verisof does not believe in the religious culture established on Anacreon, he does not "think any less of the believers or wish them any harm" and recognizes religion as "the best way of doing some good at a time when science has become tainted with the Empire's failure."

Verisof is voiced by William Fox in episode two "The Mayors" of the 1973 radio adaptation The Foundation Trilogy.

Verisof is portrayed by Kulvinder Ghir in season two of the 2021 TV series adaptation Foundation. He is High Claric of the Foundation's propagandist Church of the Galactic Spirit. Verisof, who was a child at the dawn of the Foundation, is Brother Constant's superior and companion. He is described as "Whip-smart and sardonic, he's also a terrible drunk — intelligent enough to see the path he's on, but too cynical to change. The character is portrayed as child by Jairaj Varsani in season one, and the season two episode "Where the Stars Are Scattered Thinly".

== Others from the novels ==
- Yugo Amaryl is a trusted colleague of Hari Seldon who works closely with him on the development of psychohistory. In Prelude to Foundation, Hari Seldon meets Amaryl, a menial worker in the heatsinks of the Dahl sector of Trantor, where vast subterranean operations generate energy from heat in the deep recesses of the planet. Seldon and Dors Venabili are on a danger-fraught tour of several of Trantor's 800 varied sectors, evading capture by First Minister Eto Demerzel while gathering information Seldon hopes will inform if and how psychohistory can be developed into a predictive science. Amaryl reveals himself to be a mathematical prodigy, and once Seldon is safe he arranges for Amaryl to begin studies at Streeling University. In Forward the Foundation, Amaryl has earned a doctorate and is Seldon's closest and most trusted colleague, working with him on the development of psychohistory. Seldon's 12-year-old granddaughter Wanda finds an error in one of the equations generated by Amaryl's Prime Radiant. Amaryl soon realizes that she is not a mathematical prodigy, but instead possesses nascent mentalic ability which she unknowingly used to read his mind and pick up on his subconscious sense that the formula was wrong. Seldon and a dying Amaryl revive their idea of developing two foundations that would serve as the beginnings of a new Galactic Empire. The First Foundation would be a group of scholars tasked with creating the Encyclopedia Galactica to preserve the sum of human knowledge, and to be a haven for technological advance, which psychohistory predicts would decrease the recovery time to form a second Galactic Empire. The Second Foundation would be a group of Mentalics, acting as guardians of the psychohistorical track by "introducing fine adjustments" influencing historical events.
- Pelleas Anthor is a new member of the Foundation cabal looking for the location of the Second Foundation in the Second Foundation story "Part II: Search by the Foundation". He shares his belief that the second Foundation is on Kalgan. Dr. Toran Darell II invents an electronic "Mind Static" device which disrupts Second Foundation mental influence and can be fatal to its agents. It reveals that Anthor and some others are Second Foundation sleeper agents. Dr. Darell and the Foundation are left believing they have eliminated the Second Foundation, when in fact the entire situation has been orchestrated by the intact Second Foundation for just that purpose.

Anthor is voiced by Gabriel Woolf in episode eight "Star's End" of the 1973 radio adaptation The Foundation Trilogy.

- Ammel Brodrig is Emperor Cleon II's Privy Secretary in the Foundation and Empire story "The General". He is sent to Siwenna to observe General Bel Riose, who has mounted an offensive against the Foundation in Cleon's name. Though Brodrig is not fooled by Lathan Devers' attempt to implicate Riose in a nonexistent coup, Devers and Ducem Barr push the false conspiracy again on Trantor, and this time Riose and Brodrig are arrested for treason and executed. Nicolas David Gevers saw Brodrig as based on Narses, an important member of the court of Byzantine emperor Justinian I, "who dogged Belisarius"—the model for Bel Riose—"and ultimately replaced him as general".

Brodrig is voiced by Martin Friend in episode four "The General" of the 1973 radio adaptation The Foundation Trilogy.

- Lady Callia is the flighty consort of Lord Stettin, the ruler of Kalgan, in the Second Foundation story "Part II: Search by the Foundation". Arkady Darell manipulates Callia to persuade Stettin to allow librarian Homir Munn, secretly an agent of the Foundation, access to the Mule's palace for research purposes. Munn is searching for clues to the location of the elusive Second Foundation. When Stettin holds Munn hostage as part of his offensive against the Foundation, Callia helps Arkady escape. Only in their final moments together does Arkady realize that Callia is a shrewd agent of the Second Foundation who has been subtly manipulating events on Kalgan.

Wimmer and Wilkins wrote "In the case of Lady Callia, Asimov seems to get inside her own head quite a bit without ever hinting at her true nature, and so the misdirect seems more than a little unfair. I suppose one could argue Asimov is making the point that a Second Foundation agent's disguise is so absolute that even the omniscient narrator cannot pierce the truth ... but that seems pretty weak".
Callia is voiced by Prunella Scales in episode eight "Star's End" of the 1973 radio adaptation The Foundation Trilogy.

- Linge Chen is the corrupt Commissioner of Public Safety introduced in Foundation in the story "The Psychohistorians". When presented with the argument that Hari Seldon's psychohistory is a means to save humanity's future, Chen comments that this is of no concern to men and women who will all be dead in fifty years' time.

Wimmer and Wilkins called Chen "the most memorable character" in the story, "mostly because of his impressive silence."

- Toran Darell II is the scientist son of Bayta and Toran Darell in the Second Foundation story "Part II: Search by the Foundation". He is part of a cabal within the Foundation which has been alerted to the galactic manipulations of the Second Foundation and its Mentalics, and sees them as a threat to their own efforts toward Seldon's Plan. Dr. Darell invents an electronic "Mind Static" device which disrupts Second Foundation mental influence and can be fatal to its agents. Discovering several Second Foundation sleeper agents, he tests Arkady to make sure she has not been compromised. Dr. Darell is relieved to find that the results are negative, not knowing that the Second Foundation did actually "adjust" Arkady shortly after birth, rendering their influence impossible to trace. Dr. Darell and the Foundation are left believing they have eliminated the Second Foundation, when in fact the entire situation has been orchestrated by the intact Second Foundation for just that purpose.

Wimmer and Wilkins argued that Dr. Darell's hostility toward the Second Foundation does not entirely make sense considering his devotion to Seldon's Plan, but is justified by his objection to the Second Foundation's ability to oppress the population by what is effectively mind control. They compared Dr. Darell to Salvor Hardin in that "he is trying to defeat an enemy against whom he is seemingly completely unmatched with only the dimmest awareness of how he can even fight the battle", and wrote that he is depicted as "every bit the romantic his daughter Arkady is, even if his romanticism has become wrapped up in careful plotting, endless psychology, and cutting-edge neuroscience."
Dr. Darell is voiced by Carleton Hobbs in episode eight "Star's End" of the 1973 radio adaptation The Foundation Trilogy.

- Lord Dorwin is an Imperial emissary sent to mediate the negotiations Between the Foundation and Anacreon in Foundation in the story "The Encyclopedists". Dorwin's commentary on the Empire inadvertently illustrates its decline to Salvor Hardin. Further, Dorwin's contradictory arguments render his peace treaty meaningless.

Wimmer and Wilkins described Dorwin as "pretty hilarious."
Dorwin is voiced by Ronald Herdman in episode one "Psychohistory and Encyclopedia" of the 1973 radio adaptation The Foundation Trilogy.

- Manella Dubanqua is a prostitute who acts as an informant for Gambol Deen Namarti, who is plotting against Hari Seldon in Forward the Foundation. Raych Seldon infiltrates Namarti's group and becomes involved with Dubanqua. Recognizing him as Seldon's son, Namarti drugs Raych to assassinate Seldon, but Raych is stopped by Dubanqua, secretly a security agent. Raych and Dubanqua marry and have two daughters, Wanda and Bellis.
- Indbur is the hereditary Mayor of Terminus in the Foundation and Empire story "The Mule". He is "a weak bureaucrat who relies on strict procedure and tolerates no deviance from his orders." The complacent Mayor Indbur is nonplussed about the danger posed by the Mule, believing that the pending hologram from Hari Seldon will tell them how to handle this latest crisis. Instead, Seldon predicts a civil war between the Foundation and the Traders. The Mule's forces arrive, and Indbur surrenders immediately. It is later revealed that the Mule is able to conquer planets bloodlessly because he is a mutant who can sense and manipulate the emotions of others.

Indbur is voiced by John Ruddock in episode five "The Mule" of the 1973 radio adaptation The Foundation Trilogy. Indbur will be portrayed by Leo Bill in season three of the 2021 television series adaptation Foundation.

- Jerril is an agent for the Commission of Public Safety in Foundation, in the story "The Psychohistorians". He spies on Gaal during his trip to the observatory and confirms that Gaal is working with Seldon.

Jerril is portrayed by Reece Shearsmith in the 2021 television series adaptation Foundation. In "The Emperor's Peace", he is an Imperial agent who allows Gaal Dornick to examine the Prime Radiant so that she may discredit Hari Seldon's dire calculations.

- Laskin "Jo-Jo" Joranum is an ambitious politician in Forward the Foundation who schemes to replace Eto Demerzel as Cleon I's First Minister, with the goal of ultimately deposing the emperor himself. Realizing the danger, Hari Seldon has his foster son Raych "reveal" that Demerzel is a robot. Joranum accuses Demerzel, who seemingly proves himself to not be a robot by laughing, as a human would. A humiliated Joranum is exiled to a distant planet.
- Yohan Lee is Salvor Hardin's chief advisor and friend in the Foundation story "The Encyclopedists" who assists him in overthrowing the ruling board of Terminus City.

Lee is voiced by John Hollis in episode one "Psychohistory and Encyclopedia" and episode two "The Mayors" of the 1973 radio adaptation The Foundation Trilogy.

- Homir Munn is an agent of the Foundation in the Second Foundation story "Part II: Search by the Foundation". He is part of a cabal within the Foundation which has been alerted to the galactic manipulations of the Second Foundation and its Mentalics, and sees them as a threat to their own efforts toward Seldon's Plan. Munn is sent to Kalgan to search for clues to the Second Foundation's location, and is followed by teenager Arkady Darell. Munn is rebuffed by Lord Stettin, the current warlord of Kalgan, but Arkady manipulates his flighty consort, Lady Callia, to persuade Stettin to allow librarian Munn access to the Mule's palace for research purposes. Stettin becomes suspicious that his court might have been infiltrated by the Second Foundation, and arrests Munn. After Stettin's invasion of the Foundation on Terminus fails, Munn believes the Second Foundation never existed. He is proven incorrect when several Second Foundation sleeper agents are discovered.

Munn is voiced by David March in episode eight "Star's End" of the 1973 radio adaptation The Foundation Trilogy.

- Gambol Deen Namarti is an associate of Jo-Jo Joranum who plots to supplant Hari Seldon as Cleon I's First Minister after Joranum's exile in Forward the Foundation. He attempts to assassinate Seldon by drugging his foster son Raych, but the plan is foiled at the last moment by undercover security officer Manella Dubanqua.
- Limmar Ponyets is a Master Trader of the Foundation introduced in Foundation in the story "The Traders". He negotiates with the Elders of the planet Askone to secure the release of Eskel Gorov, another Foundation trader of nuclear weapons who has been imprisoned and sentenced to death due to traditional taboos that effectively ban advanced technology. Ponyets manipulates the Elders using their religious beliefs and a transmuter that will convert iron into gold.

Wimmer and Wilkins called Ponyets "the least interesting of all the Foundation protagonists", but wrote that he and Salvor Hardin "let the bad guys accumulate all this power, and then ever so deftly turn it back against them." They also described Ponyets's blackmail of an ambitious politician as "lame" compared to "the operatic scope of Hardin's secret plan in 'The Mayors'."

- Raych Seldon is a street urchin in the slums of Billibotton whom Hari Seldon and Dors Venabili meet as they traverse Trantor in Prelude to Foundation. In Forward the Foundation, Seldon determines that populist Jo-Jo Joranum is scheming to replace Eto Demerzel as Cleon I's First Minister and then overthrow the emperor. Seldon has Raych, now his foster son, "reveal" that Demerzel is a robot. Joranum confronts Demerzel publicly, and is ruined when Demerzel seemingly proves himself to not be a robot by laughing, as a human would. Years later, Joranum's associate Gambol Deen Namarti plots against Seldon. Raych infiltrates Namarti's group and becomes involved with a prostitute named Manella Dubanqua. Recognizing him as Seldon's son, Namarti drugs Raych, who is stopped from assassinating Seldon himself by Dubanqua, secretly a security agent. Raych and Dubanqua marry and have two daughters, Wanda and Bellis. Raych emigrates from Trantor to the planet Santanni, and is killed fighting anti-Imperial rebels.
- Wanda Seldon is the daughter of Raych Seldon and Manella Dubanqua. In Forward the Foundation, 12-year-old Wanda finds an error in one of the equations generated by Yugo Amaryl's Prime Radiant. Amaryl soon realizes that she is not a mathematical prodigy, but instead possesses nascent mentalic ability which she unknowingly used to read his mind and pick up on his subconscious sense that the formula was wrong. This leads to a revival of Seldon and Amaryl's plan to create a Second Foundation made up of Mentalics.
- Sef Sermak is a political rival to Salvor Hardin, introduced in Foundation in the story "The Mayors". Sermak's Actionist party proposes that the Foundation takes direct action against Anacreon and the three other local kingdoms instead of Hardin's subtle method of technology trade and scientism. After Hardin's methods save the Foundation from the crisis, Sermak concedes that Hardin was correct all along. Years after Hardin relinquishes power as mayor, Sermak succeeds him.

Sermak is voiced by John Samson in episode two "The Mayors" of the 1973 radio adaptation The Foundation Trilogy. Sermak is portrayed by Oliver Chris in season two of the 2021 television series adaptation Foundation. Director Sermak is the leader of the Foundation, and he and his husband Pater are the fathers of Brother Constant.

- Lord Stettin is the First Citizen and ruler of Kalgan, 55 years after the Mule's death of natural causes, in the Second Foundation story "Part II: Search by the Foundation". He believes that the Mule's actions have made the Seldon Plan irrelevant, and declares war upon the Foundation. Stettin intends to usurp their role in the formation of the Second Empire, and is unconcerned by the possible intervention of the Second Foundation. He prepares a full-scale invasion of the original Foundation on Terminus, but is handily defeated, in part because the Second Foundation has used their psychic abilities to reduce the morale of his troops while boosting the Foundation's. It is also later revealed that Lady Callia is a Second Foundation agent who manipulated Stettin into declaring war so that he would lose.

Stettin is voiced by Peter Pratt in episode eight "Star's End" of the 1973 radio adaptation The Foundation Trilogy.

- Jorane Sutt is the secretary to the Mayor of Terminus in the Foundation story "The Merchant Princes". As the real power behind the Mayor, he is threatened by the rising political power of Master Trader Hober Mallow. Sutt sends Mallow on an investigative mission accompanied by his spy, Jaim Twer, and later has him tried for murder. When Mallow is exonerated and named Mayor, he arrests Sutt and his accomplices.

Wimmer and Wilkins described "scheming Terminus politico" Sutt's plan as "subtly worse than anything we've seen before—he wants to turn the science-based clergy against the Foundation, leading the combined might of the Four Kingdoms against all his enemies on Terminus, and then in turn he will start conquering the rest of the galaxy ... he's actually trying to pervert the Seldon Plan to his own ends."
Sutt is voiced by Anthony Jackson in episode three "The Merchant Princes" of the 1973 radio adaptation The Foundation Trilogy.

== Introduced in the TV series ==
The 2021 Apple TV+ television series adaptation Foundation invents several characters who do not appear in Asimov's series of novels.

=== Brother Constant ===
Brother Constant is a claric of the Foundation's propagandist Church of the Galactic Spirit, portrayed by Isabella Laughland in season two. Described as "cheerfully confident", she is a "true believer" in Seldon's Plan whose job is to extol its virtues and "whose courage and passion make her hard not to love." Introduced in the 2023 episode "A Glimpse of Darkness", Constant is also the daughter of Foundation Director Sef Sermak and his husband Pater. In "King and Commoner", she and her superior, High Claric Poly Verisof, escape capture on Korell with trader and con man Hober Mallow. Hari Seldon tasks Constant and Poly to begin peace talks with the Empire in "Where the Stars are Scattered Thinly". They are promptly arrested when attempting to do so on Trantor in "Why the Gods Made Wine". In "The Last Empress", Mallow saves Constant from execution by the Empire, and they consummate their relationship. In the season two finale "Creation Myths", Mallow puts Constant in the only remaining escape pod of the doomed Imperial flagship Shining Destiny, and sends her to safety as he and General Bel Riose sacrifice themselves on the exploding ship.

Jeffrey Speicher of Collider wrote that Constant's "straightforward, shoot-from-the-hip manner is one of the most fun and refreshing aspects of a mind-bending show that can sometimes feel a little overwhelming with the pure size and scope of the stories it takes on." Julia Glassman of The Mary Sue described Constant as "one of the funniest and most relatable figures in the series" and "a thoroughly funny, lovable character", and calling her "the queen of deadpan gags." Richard Edwards of Space.com described the character as having "charm to spare". Sean T. Collins of Decider praised Constant's "forthrightness and directness" in propositioning Mallow, and Speicher agreed that her "straightforward and refreshing approach to expressing her feelings for Hober brings a natural and organic dynamic to [their] romantic storyline." Speicher described the relationship between Constant and Mallow as "the best romantic relationship in Foundation so far." Collins appreciated that "Constant is attracted to, not repulsed by, Hober's swagger."

=== Glawen Curr ===
Glawen Curr is the husband and second-in-command to General Bel Riose, portrayed by Dino Fetscher in season two. In the 2023 episode "King and Commoner", disgraced Riose is freed from imprisonment at the Lepsis penal colony and reunited with Curr, both men having been previously told that the other was executed. Restored to his position as Fleet Supremus, Curr joins Riose in his investigation of the dissident Foundation on behalf of the Empire. In "Where the Stars are Scattered Thinly", Riose and Curr visit Imperial informant Ducem Barr on Siwenna and learn that the Foundation, and by extension their propagandists the Church of the Galactic Spirit, possess forbidden technology. Riose and Curr debate their options for turning against Empire in "A Necessary Death", but Riose ultimately declares any such action to be too great a risk.

The Imperial fleet faces off against the Foundation in "Long Ago, Not Far Away". Riose believes he can end the conflict without violence. The Emperor clone Brother Day, however, baited by Hari Seldon, orders Riose to crash the Invictus, an ancient Imperial warship commandeered by the Foundation, into Terminus to devastate the planet and destroy the Foundation. Riose reluctantly does so, even though he knows Curr is on the surface. A scheme orchestrated by Seldon destroys the Imperial fleet in the season two finale "Creation Myths". Riose kills Day, but is trapped on his doomed flagship and dies in its destruction. Meanwhile, Curr and the population of Terminus have escaped the planet's destruction via Seldon's Vault.

Gary Grimes of Attitude described the emotional reunion of Riose and Curr as "a cornerstone moment in the high-octane series". The series depicts their homosexuality as a non-issue. Fetscher said: "It was so refreshing that our characters' sexualities were just incidental ... In this world, sexuality is very different. It's just the same as you have blue eyes and I have brown eyes. In lots of ways, it's really inspiring because it's not so far in the future."

=== Raych Foss ===
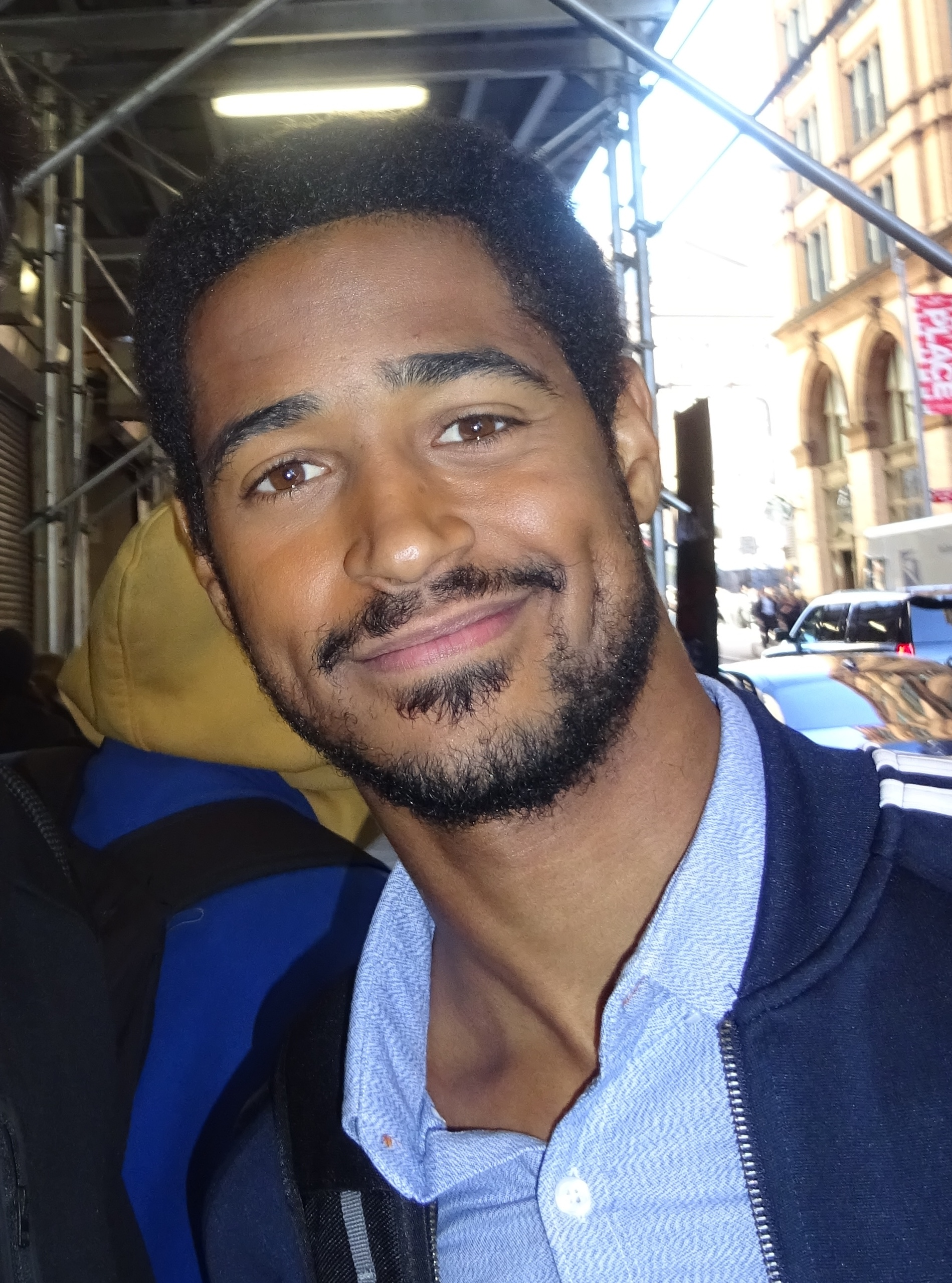
Alfred Enoch portrays Raych Foss in the 2021 TV series.

Raych Foss is the close friend and protégé of Hari Seldon, portrayed by Alfred Enoch. There is an immediate attraction between Foss and mathematical prodigy Gaal Dornick when they meet in "The Emperor's Peace". During the multi-year journey to Terminus to establish Seldon's repository of human knowledge in "Preparing to Live", Dornick and Foss have begun a romantic relationship. Seldon disapproves, as he values science and detachment, and considers emotion and human relationships as distractions. The relationship between Seldon and Foss is also strained, as evidenced by Foss's apparent bitterness about what happened to his real father after he chose to live with Hari, and his alarm when he learns from Dornick that Seldon's computations are not complete. In the middle of her daily swimming ritual, Dornick has a sudden urge to seek out Seldon, and stumbles upon Foss stabbing him to death. Foss ushers her into an escape pod with the murder weapon and jettisons her from the ship. In "Upon Awakening", Dornick awakens from cryosleep 34 years later, aboard an automated starship prepared by Foss. He has been executed for Seldon's murder, and she is believed to be an accomplice.

A digital, holographic copy of Seldon's consciousness, stored in the knife Foss used to kill him, explains himself to Dornick in "Mysteries and Martyrs". Afflicted with a rapidly escalating neurological disorder, he had planned to commit suicide to preserve his followers' devotion to his genius, while Dornick helped establish the Foundation on Terminus and Foss was to take the digital Seldon elsewhere. Foss and Dornick's unexpected relationship had jeopardized this plan, so Seldon had convinced Foss to kill him as the only way to guarantee Dornick's future, but in fact to force their separation. Foss had foiled this plan as well by sending Dornick off in the escape pod intended for him. In "The Missing Piece", Seldon explains that Foss was supposed to lead a secret, Second Foundation which Seldon created on his home planet, Helicon, and urges Dornick to let the starship take her there but refusing to give details. Done with Seldon's manipulations, Dornick instead takes the escape pod on a journey to Synnax that will last 138 years. Foss and Dornick are revealed to be the biological parents of Salvor Hardin in the 2021 season one finale episode "The Leap".

Foss is named after, but not based on, Seldon's adoptive son Raych from Asimov's prequel novels Prelude to Foundation and Forward the Foundation.

=== Sareth ===
Sareth is the newly crowned Queen of Cloud Dominion, portrayed by Ella-Rae Smith in season two. She is described as "used to being underestimated", which she uses to her advantage, "charming her way into the Imperial Palace with biting wit, all while on a secret quest for revenge." The reigning Cleon clone, Brother Day, decides to halt the genetic degradation of his bloodline by marrying and fathering an heir with her. Lady Demerzel, an ageless robot and the real power behind the Imperial throne, schemes to be rid of Sareth and retain the Genetic Dynasty of Cleon clones she has administered for centuries. Sareth and Brother Dawn, Day's successor, fall in love and flee Demerzel, with Sareth carrying Dawn's child.

The character Sareth is original to the TV series, and Screen Rant noted that she was added as part of the expansion of Emperor Cleon's role in the series.

=== Others ===
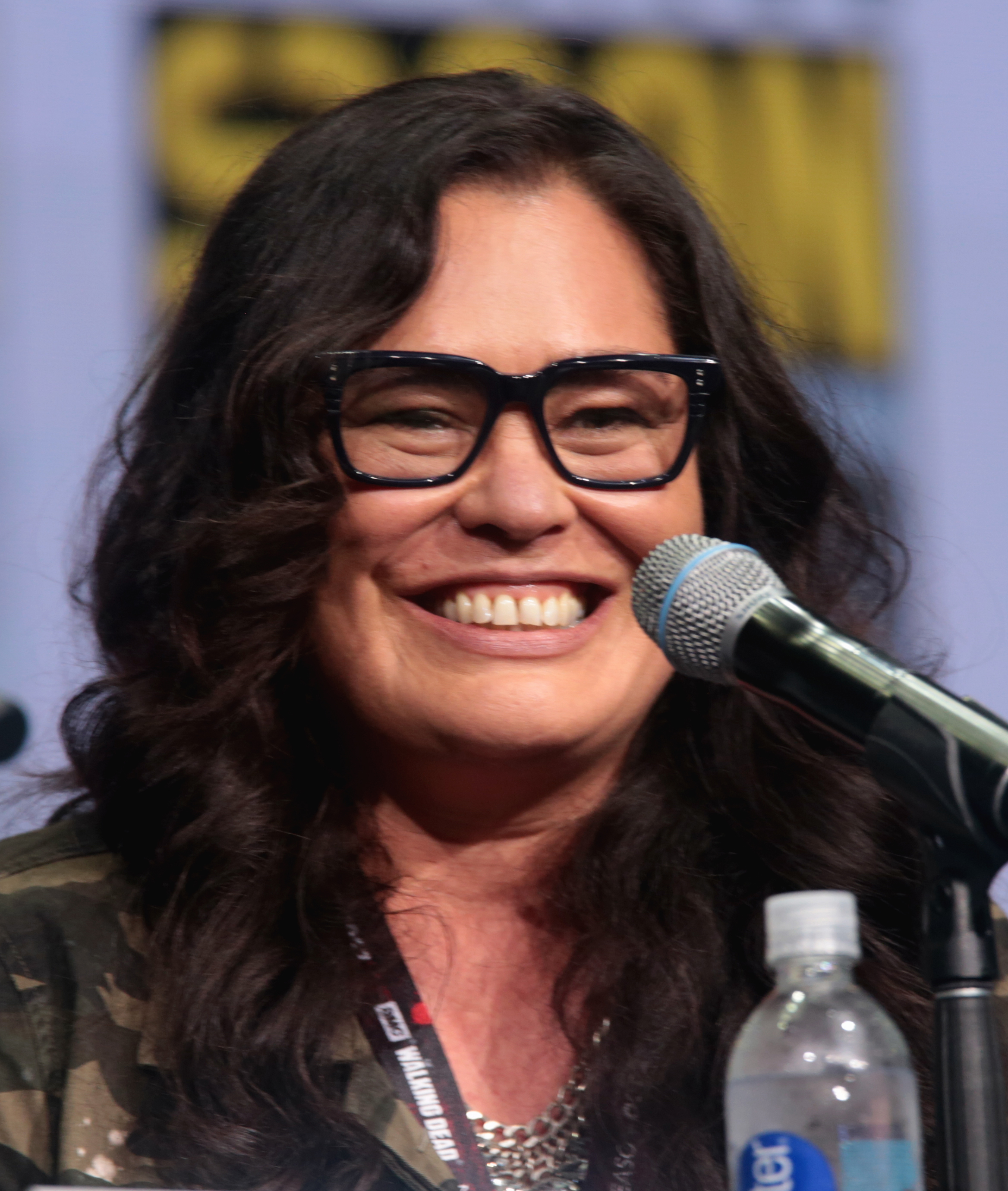
Rachel House portrays Bond in the 2021 TV series.

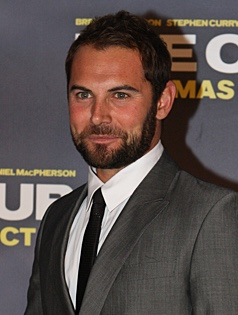
Daniel MacPherson portrays Hugo Crast in the 2021 TV series.

- Tellem Bond is the leader of a community of the Mentalics on the planet Ignis, portrayed by Rachel House in season two. She uses her psychic powers in a destructive and selfish way, inhabiting a succession of young human bodies as a form of immortality while leading a relatively innocuous culture of Mentalics seeking sanctuary from persecution elsewhere in the galaxy.
- Rue Corintha is Queen Sareth's politically savvy retainer and advisor, portrayed by Sandra Yi Sencindiver in season two. A former courtesan, Enjoiner Rue shares a past with Brother Dusk, and uses the connection to attempt to weaken his trust in Lady Demerzel, who she has discovered is the last surviving sentient robot. In September 2023, Collider wrote, "Enjoiner Rue has proven to be the most calculating schemer and manipulator in the Foundation universe so far."
- Hugo Crast is a pilot and interplanetary trader from Thespis, portrayed by Daniel MacPherson in seasons one and two. He is Salvor Hardin's loyal friend and lover. Collider described him as "the Han Solo of Foundation.
- Kray Dorwin is the commander of the Imperial military jumpship Aegis, portrayed by Christian Contreras. He is sent to Terminus to investigate the loss of contact from the Foundation in the season one episode "Barbarians at the Gate". The Aegis is shot down by invading Anacreons in "Upon Awakening", and in "Death and the Maiden", Dorwin is taken hostage by Phara Keaen, the Grand Huntress of Anacreon, who intends to use him and several Foundation technicians to commandeer a "lost" Imperial warship, Invictus. In "Mysteries and Martyrs", Keaen uses Dorwin to get through the security protocols of Invictus, and then kills him. His body is discovered over a century later in the season two episode "In Seldon's Shadow", alerting the Empire that the Foundation on Terminus has not been destroyed, as they were led to believe.
- Jaegger Fount is a Warden of Terminus and guardian against external threats, portrayed by Holt McCallany in season two. In "A Glimpse of Darkness", Hari Seldon's Vault opens, and Fount is incinerated as he approaches it.
- Abbas and Mari Hardin are members of the Foundation on Terminus and Salvor Hardin's surrogate parents, portrayed by Clarke Peters and Sasha Behar in season one.
- Halima Ifa is a Zephyr, a senior priestess of the Luminist faith vying to become its next leader, the Proxima, portrayed by T'Nia Miller in season one. Joelle Monique of TheWrap praised Miller's "jaw-dropping performance".
- Kalle is a mathematician whose work helped Hari Seldon create his Prime Radiant, portrayed by Rowena King in season two. Gaal Dornick uses Kalle's Ninth Proof of Folding to solve the Abraxas Conjecture, which brings Dornick to Seldon's attention. An avatar of Kalle appears to Seldon's artificial consciousness within the Vault in "In Seldon's Shadow", and instructs him to meet her again on Oona's World. He does so in "King and Commoner", and is transferred into a living body.
- Phara Keaen is the Grand Huntress of Anacreon, portrayed by Kubbra Sait in season one. She is the top military officer of her planet, and personally leads a raid on Terminus as part of her plan to exact her revenge on the Empire. Comic Book Resources called her "TV's most merciless villain."
- Azura Odili is a palace gardener, portrayed by Amy Tyger in season one. She begins a secret relationship with Brother Dawn.
- Yanna Seldon is Hari Seldon's deceased scientist wife, portrayed by Nimrat Kaur in season two. An avatar of Yanna appears to Hari's artificial consciousness within the Vault in "In Seldon's Shadow". In "Why the Gods Made Wine", it is revealed via flashback that Yanna had been pregnant with their daughter when she was killed by Dr. Tadj, a university administrator ordered by the Empire to acquire Hari's Prime Radiant. In the novels, Seldon's wife is Dors Venabili, a historian who supports him before and during his development of psychohistory, and is ultimately revealed to be a benevolent robot.
- She-Bends-Light is a Spacer on Imperial General Bel Riose's flagship, Shining Destiny, portrayed by Judi Shekoni in season two. In "A Necessary Death", trader Hober Mallow approaches the Spacers on Hari Seldon's behalf, but they decline his offer to free them from the Empire's servitude, and turn him over to Riose. In "Creation Myths", his capture is revealed to have been a ruse to smuggle a special jump sequence to She-Bends-Light. She uses it to program the fleet's warships to jump into one another, which will inevitably destroy them all and free the remaining Spacers from the Empire.
