= Bel Riose =

Fictional character from the Foundation series by Isaac Asimov

- Foundation character
- Bel Riose as depicted in "Dead Hand" (Astounding Science Fiction, April 1945)
- First appearance: "Dead Hand" (1945)
- Created by: Isaac Asimov
- Portrayed by: Ben Daniels; Foundation (2023)
- Voiced by: Dinsdale Landen; The Foundation Trilogy (1973)

In-universe information
- Species: Human
- Gender: Male
- Occupation: General
- Affiliation: Galactic Empire
- Spouse: TV series: Glawen Curr

Bel Riose is a fictional character in the Foundation series by Isaac Asimov. In the 1945 novella "Dead Hand", he is the last great general of the declining Galactic Empire. He targets the Foundation both as a perceived threat to the Empire and to further his own ambitions, but is outmaneuvered by its agents.

Riose is voiced by Dinsdale Landen in the 1973 BBC Radio 4 adaptation The Foundation Trilogy. He is portrayed by Ben Daniels in season two of the 2021 Apple TV+ television series adaptation Foundation.

== Literature ==
Bel Riose appears in the novella "Dead Hand", published in the April 1945 issue of Astounding Science Fiction. It was later retitled "The General" and paired with the November/December 1945 novella "The Mule", and published as Foundation and Empire in 1952.

=== Description ===
Riose is loosely based on Belisarius, a great general of the Roman Empire who served Justinian I during the 6th century AD. Josh Wimmer and Alasdair Wilkins of Gizmodo wrote:

Bel Riose might be the best example I've seen of an anti-villain—his goal is the destruction of the Foundation and the defeat of the Seldon Plan, and he can be quite brutal in his means, but he's fundamentally honorable, honest, and really rather brilliant. You might even call him the tragic hero of the Foundation series, struggling in vain against the forces of history for no greater reason than to prove that he can. He certainly gets an appropriately tragic ending.

James E. Gunn saw Riose as "the only character who stares in the face of determinism". While his failure against the forces of historic necessity might seem depressing, the fact that he is not the viewpoint character changes the impact of the story: The reader sympathizes with the Foundation. Riose's failure is depicted as desirable, as it ensures the Foundation's survival.

=== Plot ===
In "Dead Hand", Imperial General Bel Riose governs the planet Siwenna. He investigates the Foundation and is soon determined to destroy it, both as a perceived threat to the Empire and to further his own ambitions. Foundation trader Lathan Devers lets himself be captured by Riose to disrupt his overtures against the Foundation from the inside. With Emperor Cleon II's Privy Secretary Ammel Brodrig present to observe Riose, Devers attempts to implicate Riose in a nonexistent attempt to overthrow Cleon. His machinations are exposed, but Ducem Barr, a Foundation sympathizer forced to aid Riose, helps him escape further interrogation by knocking Riose unconscious and fleeing the planet with Devers in tow. They travel to the Imperial capital planet, Trantor, and plot to influence Cleon directly with Devers' invented conspiracy, implicating both Riose and Brodrig. Though they are caught by the Secret Police, they escape and later learn that Riose and Brodrig have been arrested for treason and executed. Asimov later explains the political dynamics of why Riose would never have been able to defeat the Foundation: a strong emperor's sense of self-preservation would never allow him to tolerate a subordinate who develops potentially threatening power.

== Adaptations ==
=== Radio ===
Riose is voiced by Dinsdale Landen in episode four "The General" of the 1973 BBC Radio 4 adaptation The Foundation Trilogy.

=== Television ===
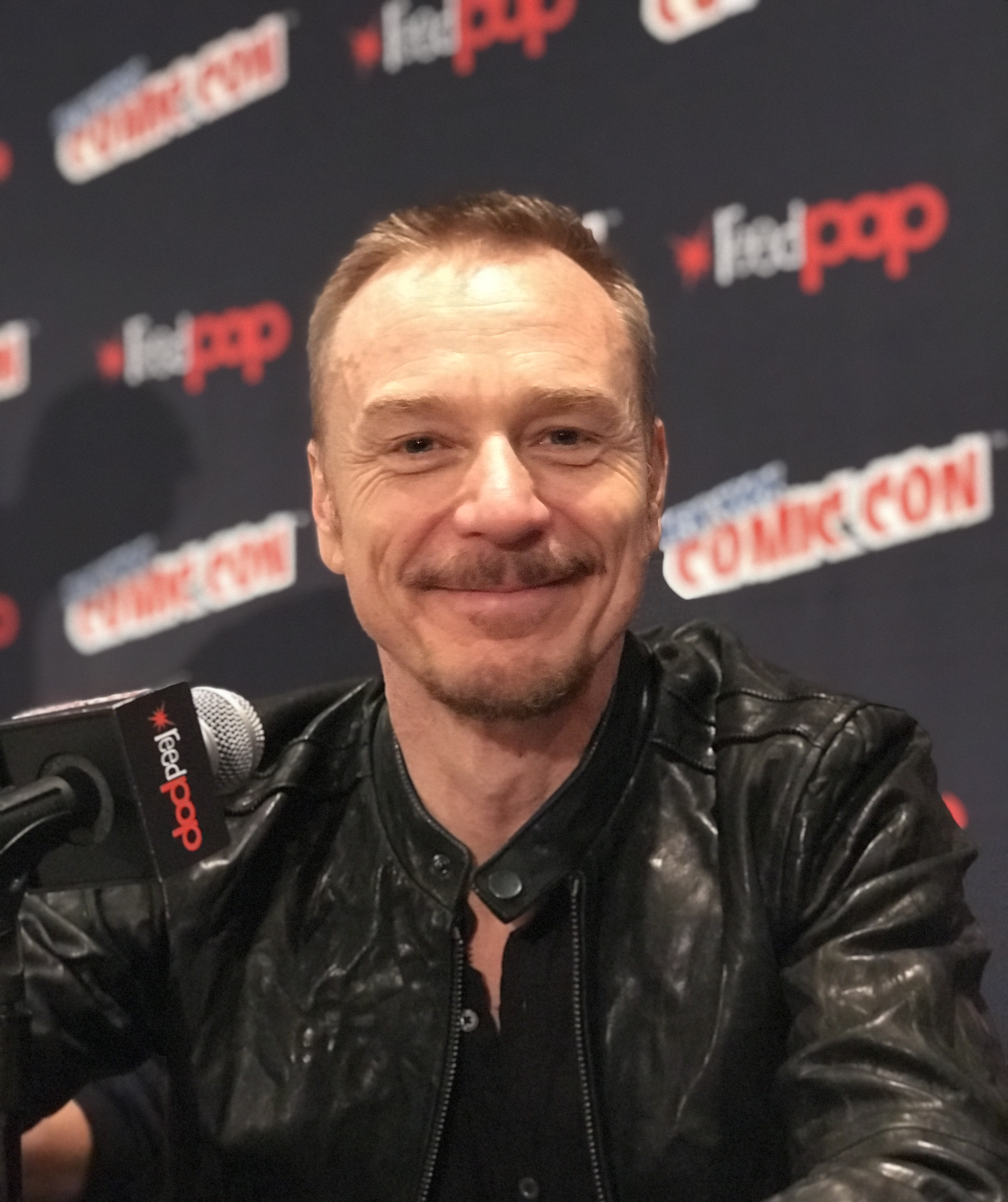
Ben Daniels portrays Bel Riose in the 2021 TV series.

Riose is portrayed by Ben Daniels in season two of the 2021 Apple TV+ television series adaptation Foundation. He is the last great general of the Superliminal Fleet, imprisoned by Emperor Cleon for breaking orders to save troops, despite still achieving a victory. Riose is described as "noble to a fault, but his fealty to the Galactic Empire is waning." The Empire has learned that the Foundation has not been destroyed as had been previously believed, and is in fact flourishing and amassing influence. Riose, known to be ruthless and unpredictable, seems the perfect military leader to set upon the Foundation, but he is also bitter toward the Empire for imprisoning him and telling him that his husband had been executed. Sean T. Collins of Decider wrote, "I enjoyed Bel Riose's case for rejoining the government that destroyed him even though Empire clearly fears his strength: As the only human whom Cleon does not see as dispensable, it's his responsibility to protect the citizens of the Empire, since Empire himself cannot and will not."

==== Storyline ====
In the 2023 episode "King and Commoner", Cleon's emissary Lady Demerzel visits Riose at the Lepsis penal colony, offering him his freedom to investigate the Foundation on behalf of the Empire. He is also reunited with his husband and former second-in-command, Glawen Curr, both men having been previously told that the other was executed. In "Where the Stars are Scattered Thinly", Riose and Curr visit Imperial informant Ducem Barr on Siwenna and learn that the Foundation, and by extension their propagandists the Church of the Galactic Spirit, possess auras, protective force shield technology forbidden to everyone except the Emperors, and whisper-ships, a Foundation-created type of jumpship which can perform faster-than-light travel without requiring an enhanced human Spacer to navigate. As Riose and Curr flee an anti-Imperial mob, Riose mercy kills Barr at his request. Riose and Curr debate their options for turning against Empire in "A Necessary Death", but Riose ultimately declares any such action to be too great a risk.

The Imperial fleet faces off against the Foundation in "Long Ago, Not Far Away", and Riose believes he can end the conflict without violence. But the Emperor clone Brother Day, baited by Hari Seldon, orders Riose to crash the Invictus, an ancient Imperial warship commandeered by the Foundation, into Terminus to devastate the planet and destroy the Foundation. Riose reluctantly does so, even though he knows Curr is on the surface. In the season two finale "Creation Myths", She-Bends-Light, a Spacer on Riose's flagship Shining Destiny, uses a jump sequence smuggled onboard by con man Hober Mallow to program the fleet's warships to jump into one another, which will inevitably consume the entire fleet and free the remaining Spacers from Empire. Riose battles Day in hand-to-hand combat, and uses Mallow's castling device to switch places with Day via teleportation, venting the Emperor into space and killing him. Trapped on the doomed flagship, Riose and Mallow share a toast as the Shining Destiny explodes. Meanwhile, Curr and the population of Terminus have escaped the planet's destruction via Seldon's Vault.

==== Reception ====
Collins wrote, "Ben Daniels, who goes from a hermit of the wastes to one of the handsomest men on TV with a shave and a haircut, has a great deal of screen presence as Bel". Series executive producer David S. Goyer called Riose his favorite Foundation character. He said that the deaths of Riose and Mallow were always planned for season two, adding that "I like that they meet their fates twinned together". Gary Grimes of Attitude described the emotional reunion of Riose and Curr as "a cornerstone moment in the high-octane series." The series depicts their homosexuality as a non-issue. Curr's portrayer, Dino Fetscher, said "It was so refreshing that our characters' sexualities were just incidental ... In this world, sexuality is very different. It's just the same as you have blue eyes and I have brown eyes. In lots of ways, it's really inspiring because it's not so far in the future."
