= Cleon (Foundation) =

Fictional character in the Foundation television series

- Foundation character
- From left to right: Cassian Bilton (Dawn), Lee Pace (Day) and Terrence Mann (Dusk) in the 2021 television series
- First appearance: "The Emperor's Peace"; Foundation; September 24, 2021
- Created by: David S. Goyer; Josh Friedman
- Based on: Foundation series by Isaac Asimov
- Portrayed by: Lee Pace as Day; Terrence Mann as Dusk; Cassian Bilton as Dawn; Cooper Carter as Young Dawn

In-universe information
- Species: Human clone
- Gender: Male
- Occupation: Emperor
- Affiliation: Galactic Empire

Cleon, commonly referred to by the metonym Empire, is the name of multiple fictional characters in the 2021 Apple TV+ television series Foundation. They are the Genetic Dynasty of clones who rule the Galactic Empire. In the series, the 12,000-year-old Empire has been ruled for 400 years by a revolving trio of Cleon I clones: Brother Day, a Cleon in his prime; Brother Dusk, a retired and aging Cleon who serves in an advisory role; and Brother Dawn, a young Cleon being trained to succeed Brother Day. The series is an adaptation of the Foundation series of novels by Isaac Asimov, and stars Lee Pace as Day, Terrence Mann as Dusk, and Cassian Bilton as Dawn. Cloning does not factor in Asimov's novels, though emperors named Cleon I and Cleon II appear as supporting characters.

== Character ==
=== Casting and reception ===
The trio of Cleon clones are portrayed by Lee Pace (Brother Day), Terrence Mann (Brother Dusk) and Cassian Bilton (Brother Dawn) in the 2021 Apple TV+ television series Foundation. Pace was cast in October 2019, and Mann and Bilton were cast in December 2019. Cooper Carter plays Brother Dawn as a child in season one.

Nick Allen of RogerEbert.com described Pace's performance as "magnetic", and Chancellor Agard of Entertainment Weekly called it a "campy and playful turn". Sean O'Neal of Texas Monthly called Pace's performance "bombastic", and wrote, "Pace was simply born to play a tyrant. His Brother Day comes off like a cross between the Roman emperor Commodus and the Marquis de Sade, a narcissist with swept-back Bradley Cooper hair and a wicked smile that perpetually curls his lips. Pace imbues every line with aristocratic menace, all delivered in his stentorian, Shakespeare in the Park projection." James Dyer of Empire: "Pace brings both weight and humanity to the waning imperium ... while placing a consistent face on the empire at the story's heart." Richard Edwards of Space.com wrote that Pace's performance has "too many echoes of his stern turns" in Guardians of the Galaxy and the Hobbit films. Early trailers for the series prompted online fans to refer to Pace as "Intergalactic Emperor Daddy". Chase Hutchinson of Collider wrote:

Pace continues to give one of his best performances to date. He captures the petulance of the character which is made all the more frightening when considering how he can utterly destroy almost anything that he wants. His terrifying monologue from the end of Season 1 looms large over this as we know he has nearly unlimited resources to carry out vengeance on any who cross him ... There is a humor that Pace brings to the character, showing Day's insecurities when he is challenged with an almost pouty face that is just delightful. He is the type of villain that is worth building an entire show around, making his creation for this story a worthwhile one. His ignorance of so much that is happening around him makes him feel more dangerous as there is always the potential that he could lash out without warning.

Daniel Fienberg of The Hollywood Reporter wrote that "The interplay between Mann and Pace as imperious rulers has strong theatrical energy." Caroline Framke of Variety wrote that at times, "Pace and Mann tap into a shared, visceral disdain that betrays more personality than their respective Cleons would likely care to admit exists." Sean T. Collins of Decider described Mann's performance in "The Last Empress", in which Dusk experiences one shocking revelation after another, as "fascinating to watch", and wrote, "Mann's command of the diverse emotions and affects called for here, making them seem like the product of a single unquiet mind, is deeply impressive." Collins also described Bilton's Dawn as "seemingly aroused equally by the gorgeous Sareth's unabashed come-ons and their secret rebellion against his older bro."

Chaim Gartenberg of The Verge called the Genetic Dynasty "the show's highlight, thanks in no small part to Pace's dynamic performances". Agard explained, "This curious political unit raises interesting questions about individuality and if progress is possible without fundamental change, and it's the main source of fun in the show."

=== Description ===
In the 2021 television series adaptation Foundation, the 12,000-year-old Empire has been ruled for 400 years by a revolving triumvirate of Cleon I clones: Brother Day, a Cleon in his prime; Brother Dusk, a retired and aging Cleon who serves in an advisory role; and Brother Dawn, a young Cleon being trained to succeed Brother Day. Though cloning does not factor in Asimov's novels, the television series introduces a "Genetic Dynasty", surreptitiously administered for centuries by the regal Lady Demerzel, secretly a unique, ageless humanoid robot. The clones serve as "the personification of the Empire's permanency, constant and unchanging, ever-present and never-failing." In the story, the Imperial triad scoff at mathematician Hari Seldon's predictions of the Empire's imminent fall, and exile him from the capital world, Trantor, to the distant planet Terminus. But thanks to a devastating and unprecedented terrorist attack, their eyes are now opened to the signs that the Empire is indeed decaying.

In season one, Dawn conceals his color blindness, an anomaly among the Cleons, from Day and Dusk. He and Day also exhibit signs of unprecedented emotions, making them less detached and cruel than their predecessors, which Dusk believes will spell their doom. It is eventually revealed that the rebel movement has tampered with the Cleon genetics, facing the current Day with the fact that the bloodline is now tainted and he, his successors, and likely a number of his predecessors have irrevocably diverged from the original Cleon. Dusk insists that Dawn, who was easily manipulated by the rebels, be destroyed, but Day shows compassion. Demerzel, however, recognizes the danger that Dawn now poses to the dynasty, and kills him.

In season two, a subsequent Day decides to halt the degradation of the bloodline by marrying the newly crowned Queen Sareth of Cloud Dominion and fathering an heir with her. Displeased, Demerzel feigns acceptance, but schemes to prevent the marriage and be rid of Sareth. Demerzel is revealed to be the real power behind the Imperial throne, guiding humanity on a millennial scale. The genetically corrupted Cleons increasingly veer from the path she has set for them, and she begins to act more overtly autonomous, thwarting their choices and actions, and even killing and replacing them with new copies as necessary to preserve her grand scheme for humanity.

Series executive producer David S. Goyer invented the clone emperors, who are not in Asimov's novels, as a way of providing some continuity to a story that takes place over a thousand years. O'Neal explained, "Pace's Brother Day is one of the few characters that we’re actually allowed to connect with", and described the character as "the smug embodiment of imperial hubris". Pace said of the Emperors, "On one side of their mind, they believe they're the same person. They actually believe this, and they believe that person is the Emperor of the galaxy ... And on the other side of that mind, are a series of individuals who, whether they like it or not, are individuals." Daniel Bibby of Screen Rant called the conceit of the Genetic Dynasty "a well-executed concept that allows for a centuries-long chess match between Empire and Hari Seldon." Rafael Motamayor of IGN praised the idea of clone emperors as "arguably the most fascinating addition to the show, which helps it stand out from the rest of the sci-fi landscape."

== Storyline ==
=== Season 1 ===
In "The Emperor's Peace", Hari Seldon's predictions of the Galactic Empire's imminent fall, based on his science of psychohistory, are dismissed by Brothers Day, Dawn and Dusk, the trio of Emperor Cleon I clones who rule the Empire. Seldon is spared execution for treason after a devastating terrorist attack—the destruction of the Star Bridge, Trantor's space elevator—illustrates for Day that there is indeed decay within the Empire. Seldon and his followers are exiled to Terminus to establish the "Foundation", a repository of human knowledge that Seldon claims will shorten the dark age after the Empire's demise from thirty thousand years to a single millennium. In "Preparing to Live", the Empire investigates the Star Bridge attack but is unable to identify its mastermind, or conclusively attribute it to Seldon or the governments of Anacreon or Thespis. Despite Dusk urging that the detained delegations from the two kingdoms should be granted clemency, Day opts for a public execution of all delegates except the two ambassadors, simultaneous with orbital bombardments of their homeworlds. The Genetic Dynasty undertakes its next traditional transfer of power in "The Mathematician's Ghost": a new Dawn is decanted, the current Dawn is elevated to Day, the current Day retires as Dusk, and Dusk assumes the mantle of Brother Darkness before being euthanized.

In "Barbarians at the Gate", a charismatic religious leader, Zephyr Halima Ifa, revives an orthodox, pre-Imperial dogma that asserts clones do not possess souls. This religious issue and a violent insurrection in the lower levels of Trantor fulfill two key portents of the Empire's decline that Seldon related at his trial. Day grows frustrated with Dusk, feeling his elder seeded these problems decades ago by acting impulsively and refusing to heed Seldon's warnings. While Day departs Trantor to intervene with Ifa, Dusk sends a fleet to visit the Foundation, which has fallen silent. In "Death and the Maiden", Day attempts to undermine Ifa on the holy moon at the center of the Luminist faith, but she gains the upper hand with a galvanizing speech that subtly criticizes Imperial cloning. On Trantor, Dawn pursues a romance with Azura Odili, a palace gardener, and bares his deepest secret: he inexplicably has minor genetic traits, such as color blindness, that differentiate him from all previous Cleon clones. Day is agitated by his inability to rein in the defiant Ifa in "Mysteries and Martyrs", but decides he can upstage her by undertaking Luminism's most sacred pilgrimage. Azura asks Dawn, who lives in constant fear of being replaced by another clone should his uniqueness be exposed, to consider running away with her.

In "The Missing Piece", Day completes the Spiral, a torturous trek to a desert cave pool, and claims to have received a vision of a sacred flower. The Zephyrs interpret Day's vision as a divine pronouncement that he has a soul, rendering any further criticism of Imperial cloning by a Luminist to be sacrilege, and nullifying any threat from Ifa. Day seals his victory by commanding Demerzel, his devoutly Luminist robot majordomo, to covertly assassinate Ifa. Day reflects on his experience in the cave, revealing he had no vision at all. Dawn realizes Dusk knows his secret and escapes the palace in "The First Crisis". He discovers that Azura is part of a rebel conspiracy which plans to replace him with a compliant duplicate. Dusk arrives with Imperial troops who dispatch the conspirators and their counterfeit Cleon. In "The Leap", Day tells Azura he has killed all of her relatives and everyone she has ever met, and that she will be shrouded for the rest of her life. Day decides to spare Dawn over Dusk's objections, but Demerzel sees the danger Dawn poses to the dynasty and kills him anyway, affirming that her loyalty to the Cleon dynasty supersedes Day's wishes. Day learns that the anti-Empire conspiracy has tainted the DNA of the entire Cleonic line, affecting all future generations.

=== Season 2 ===
In the season two premiere "In Seldon's Shadow", a subsequent Day survives an assassination attempt while he is having sex with Demerzel, and suspects Dawn and Dusk's involvement. Day has decided to halt the degradation of the bloodline by marrying the newly crowned Queen Sareth of Cloud Dominion, and fathering an heir with her. Wary of Day in the aftermath of the deaths of her entire family, Sareth is not enthusiastic about the proposal. Dawn and Sareth form a connection in "Where the Stars are Scattered Thinly", and Dusk reconnects with his former lover, Sareth's advisor Rue Corintha. Dusk offers to show Rue recordings of their encounter, as her memories of the event were wiped per protocol. During a heated argument with Day, Sareth accepts his marriage proposal in "The Sighted and the Seen". Dusk is disturbed to learn that Day has the authority to conduct memory audits on him and Dawn. Dusk and Dawn's shared distrust of Day grows as they discover that the original Cleon has a much larger memory hoard than subsequent clones, including them.

In "Why the Gods Made Wine", Day introduces his bride-to-be to the people of Trantor, but Sareth upstages him, wins the crowd and leaves Day feeling unsettled. After Demerzel insinuates she was somehow involved in orchestrating the murders of Sareth's family, Sareth confronts Day in "A Necessary Death". She then proposes to Dawn that he impregnate her instead of Day. Day is unnerved by a Seldon avatar, and orders a blockade around Terminus. In "The Last Empress", Day decides to deal with the troublesome Foundation on Terminus in person, despite the protestations of Dusk and Demerzel. Dusk, prodded by Corintha, realizes that he has somehow been programmed not to question Demerzel's role or origins. Dusk and Corintha discover a secret chamber guarded by a projection of Cleon I. Dawn and Sareth consummate their relationship as they realize that Demerzel has been controlling the Empire all along.

In "Long Ago, Not Far Away", Dusk and Corintha learn Demerzel's backstory. Imprisoned for 5,000 years until rediscovered by young Cleon I, Demerzel spends his lifetime telling him stories of the Robot Wars and grooming him to eventually free her. Cleon finally does in his declining years, but ever wary, he implants a chip in her first that enslaves her to his millennia-long plan to rule the universe. He intends for Demerzel to be his immortal successor, with his clones as the face of the Empire, their development and actions subtly controlled by her. Now aware of Demerzel's true function, Dusk and Corintha are trapped in the chamber by Cleon I. On Terminus, Day rages at the revelation that the Foundation's propagandist Church of the Galactic Spirit has been providing forbidden technology to its allies. He stabs the Foundation director, orders the scientists captured alive and everyone else slaughtered. Day confronts Seldon's avatar, and threatens to destroy Terminus if Seldon will not admit his math is flawed. Day believes he is different than all the Cleons before him, and can change the future that Seldon has predicted. But Seldon ignores him and instead speaks to Demerzel. He understands her true role, and gifts her with his Prime Radiant and its psychohistorical equations so that she may use it to guarantee humanity's survival. Though General Bel Riose believes he can end the conflict without violence, Day orders Terminus to be destroyed. Demerzel laments her failures in raising him, and abruptly leaves him on the Imperial flagship and heads back to Trantor. Day grins as Terminus explodes.

Demerzel confronts the trapped Dusk and Corintha in the season two finale "Creation Myths". Dusk marks Demerzel's neck with green paint before Demerzel kills him and Corintha. Dawn recognizes the green mark as the sign of a traitor and flees Trantor with Sareth, who is pregnant with his child. Day is enraged by Riose's defiance of his order to destroy more Foundation-allied worlds, and the revelation that the Imperial fleet is in the process of complete destruction via sabotage. Day battles Riose in hand-to-hand combat, and Riose uses a castling device to switch places with Day via teleportation, venting the Emperor into space and killing him. On Trantor, Demerzel decants three new Cleon clones, and activates the Prime Radiant.

=== Season 3 ===
In the third season, 152 years later, Demerzel has been able to use the Prime Radiant to prevent the decline of the Galactic Empire, although it has shrunken while the Foundation has gained more power. Because of this, the Empire was able to hold on to more power than Seldon's original calculations had predicted. By this time, the genetic drift and increasing instability of the Cleon clones has caused the cycle to be shortened. At this point, Dusk is ten days away from ascension and secretly working on a superweapon, Day has abandoned his position in favor of a hedonistic lifestyle, and Dawn is secretly working with Dornick.

The arrival of the Mule changes Seldon's psychohistory calculations as events were in motion that predicted the end of the Empire in four months despite their efforts to arrest the decline. Not only that, but the darkness beyond could also represent the extinction of the human species. Dawn went rogue to help Dornick against the Mule when he was unable to gain the support of his brothers and the Galactic Council, but this led to the destruction of the planet Kalgan and much of the Imperial Fleet by the Mule which Dornick admitted was her intention as it would weaken the Empire and strengthen the Foundation, redressing the balance of power that had been upset through Demerzel's use of the Prime Radiant. Dawn was blown into space and believed to have been killed, but he was later rescued and taken captive by the Mule's forces with severe injuries to Dawn's lower limbs.

After the Galactic Council went behind his back to make a deal with the Mule, handing over Trantor and Dusk to them, Dusk retaliated by destroying the Council, Cloud Dominion and Maiden with his new superweapon. Day's research into Demerzel's history led him to a cult worshipping another robot head, one that could be used to free Demerzel of Cleon's programming. However, upon his ascension, Dusk launched a coup, destroying all of the Cleon clones and Demerzel, killing Day and rising to power as the sole Emperor as Brother Darkness which he believed to be the true meaning of the prediction about the end of the genetic dynasty and the darkness that came after it.

However, Dawn remained alive in custody of the Mule -- revealed to in fact be Bayta Mallow -- while Demerzel had provided the Second Foundation with a safe hiding spot in the Imperial Library that was unknown to Dornick, the Mule and Darkness. Day's efforts to reactivate the robot head resulted in it sending a signal to Kalle and robots that were seemingly based on Earth's Moon.

== Literary origins ==
Introduced in the novella "Dead Hand", published in the April 1945 issue of Astounding Science Fiction, Cleon II is the last great Emperor of the Galactic Empire. Threatened by the rising power and popularity of Bel Riose, one of his own generals, Cleon has him recalled and executed for treason. Josh Wimmer and Alasdair Wilkins of Gizmodo described Cleon II as "the aging, infirmed [sic] emperor whose great mind has been let down by his faltering body." Nicholas David Gevers suggested that Cleon II is based on the Byzantine emperor Justinian I. Cleon II is voiced by William Fox in episode four "The General" of the 1973 BBC Radio 4 adaptation The Foundation Trilogy.

In the prequel novel Prelude to Foundation (1988), Emperor Cleon I learns of mathematician Hari Seldon's nascent concept of psychohistory. Brought before Cleon, Seldon emphasizes his belief that developing it as a science is likely impossible. Subsequently, interest in Seldon's work by unknown parties puts him in danger, convincing him of psychohistory's potential importance. Wimmer and Wilkens described Cleon as "basically decent but woefully inadequate" but also "a fairly entertaining character, who has me absolutely convinced that ruling a whole galaxy could be just a drag if you were born at the wrong time".

In Forward the Foundation (1993), Seldon and his foster son Raych thwart the scheme of populist Jo-Jo Joranum to become Cleon's First Minister and then overthrow him. The emperor subsequently appoints Seldon as his First Minister. Joranum's associate Gambol Deen Namarti's own plan to assassinate Seldon using a drugged Raych is also foiled, but Cleon is killed by a gardener trying to avoid promotion. A military government subsequently takes over, lasting for a decade.
