= Mikiya Eto =

Japanese footballer

Personal information
- Date of birth: 29 September 1999 (age 27)
- Place of birth: Kumamoto, Kumamoto, Japan
- Height: 1.74 m (5 ft 9 in)
- Position: Defender

Team information
- Current team: Kagoshima United
- Number: 22

Youth career
- Taiyo SC Kumamoto
- ZERO Obinishi
- 2012–2019: Roasso Kumamoto

Senior career*
Years	Team	Apps	(Gls)
2019–2020	Roasso Kumamoto	16	(0)
2021–	Kagoshima United	12	(1)
- * Club domestic league appearances and goals as of 17:04, 9 July 2021 (UTC)

Mikiya Eto (衛藤 幹弥, Etō Mikiya; born 29 September 1999) is a Japanese footballer currently playing as a defender for Kagoshima United.

== Career statistics ==
=== Club ===
As of 29 October 2020.

Club	Season	League			National Cup		League Cup		Other		Total	
Club	Season	Division	Apps	Goals	Apps	Goals	Apps	Goals	Apps	Goals	Apps	Goals
Roasso Kumamoto	2019	J3 League	2	0	1 (Note: Appearances in the Emperor's Cup)	0	0	0	0	0	3	0
Roasso Kumamoto	2020	J3 League	14	0	0	0	0	0	0	0	14	0
Career total			16	0	1	0	0	0	0	0	17	0
Kagoshima United	2021	J3 League	12	1	2	0	0	0	0	0	14	1
Career total			28	1	3	0	0	0	0	0	31	1
