= Black Harmony =

Black Harmony is a Lugbara music duo based in Arua (Northwestern Uganda). It comprises Emmanuel Ledra who sings and raps while Robert Adima provides the "reggae flavour".

== History ==
Emmanuel first did music in 2003. He formed a club called Street Culture but waited two years to produce his first song "Isabella". Then in 2006, the duo came up with "Leta" and "Munyu Munyu" which was a very powerful hit (actually added as a ringtone by Uganda telecom). This song talks about men spending their money all night with prostitutes and it made a runaway husband return to Uganda to the four women each of whom he had left behind with a kid.

A female artist named Lady Shadia doing music in Kampala once came to Arua to see how she could take her music to the next level and united with Black Harmony. They produced a quadrilingual hit called "Shadia (Baby Gal)" which was chosen as a live performance during the 2008 Bell PAM (Pearl of Africa Music) Awards. The collaboration actually scooped the preliminary 2008 Regional Award for West Nile though Dogman won the final award. "Shadia" is the second last song on the "Leta" Album, "Bacaku" which some call "Skulu" is the last one.

The third album is called "Ti Icita" meaning "Unity" in Lugbara and includes other languages like Lingala, Swahili, plus English.

The duo sing about love, community development, parental affection, hard work, procreation and AIDS Prevention.

"The Best Music is Live Music," Emmanuel confesses and they have performed with Wenge Musica from DR Congo besides his own project called "Amangonde". Other songs by Black Harmony include "Ewa Be Ma Ra", "Lucky", "Etoo", "Adiaa", "Ti Icita" (Title Track for their 3rd Album), "Jua Kali", "Anga Azi Avasi" plus "Silimu".

On Friday 5 May 2023, Black Harmony held its maiden concert called Ti Echita at Capital One in Arua City. That same year, they released a new song entitled "Isa Ma Raka" about avoiding conflicts and fights.

In 2024, they released a collaboration song with a female artiste singing the lyrics "Izi Mi Ngole?".

== Awards ==
During the inaugural West Nile Music Awards (WEMA) at Hill View Inn Arua in 2007, Black Harmony won two accolades: Song of the Year (for Munyu Munyu, off their debut six-track album) and Best Upcoming Artiste.

== Partnerships ==
In 2019, Black Harmony teamed up with Monopoly, a Lugbara artiste, to produce "Tap Tap". Arufu Records in Arua wants to sign Black Harmony to their label. Robert Bob Adima works at Radio Pacis in Ediofe Suburb of Arua City. With a plan to release new videos and songs including Gospel by the end of 2020, BH teamed up with Ivan G (Trojan Sound) to sing "Uganda (Pearl Of Africa)". They also produced a traditional blend of "Yenge Yenge" and "Endika Endika" about the plight of the girl child during the COVID-19 pandemic. "Pataa" is a Gospel tune they also worked on. In February 2022, they released a party jam collaboration with Jayharryboui ESB entitled "Ayiko" which means Happiness in Lugbara.
