= David Eto'o =

Cameroonian footballer (born 1987)

Personal information
- Full name: David Pierre Eto'o Fils
- Date of birth: 13 June 1987 (age 39)
- Place of birth: Yaoundé, Cameroon
- Height: 1.78 m (5 ft 10 in)
- Position: Right winger

Youth career
- Kadji Sports Academy

Senior career*
Years	Team	Apps	(Gls)
2003–2005	Mallorca	0	(0)
2004	→ Ciudad de Murcia (loan)	1	(0)
2005	→ Yverdon-Sport (loan)		
2005	Sedan		
2005–2006	Champagne Sports	2	(0)
2006	Meyrin		
2006	Ponferradina		
2007	Créteil	1	(0)
2007	Metalurh Donetsk	0	(0)
2007–2008	Aris	0	(0)
2007	→ Ilisiakos (loan)	1	(0)
2008–2009	Reus Deportiu		
2009–2011	Kadji Sports Academy		
2011	FC Koper	0	(0)
2011–2017	Union Douala		
2018–2019	Eding Sport		

International career
2017–2018	Cameroon	3	(0)
- * Club domestic league appearances and goals

David Pierre Eto'o Fils (born 13 June 1987) is a Cameroonian former professional footballer who played as a right winger.

== Early and personal life ==
Born in Yaoundé, he is the younger brother of Samuel Eto'o, while a younger brother Etienne also played for Real Mallorca. His father was also called David.

== Club career ==
Eto'o began his career with the Kadji Sports Academy in Cameroon, before moving to Spain at the age of 16 with RCD Mallorca. At Mallorca he spent loan spells with Ciudad de Murcia and Yverdon-Sport FC, leaving the club in 2005. Short spells at Sedan, FC Champagne Sports, FC Meyrin, SD Ponferradina and US Créteil-Lusitanos followed, before Eto'o signed with Ukrainian side FC Metalurh Donetsk in April 2007. He later signed with Greek side Aris, where he went on to have a loan spell at Ilisiakos, after his loan spell ended he left Aris and moved back to Spain in August 2008 and signed a contract with CF Reus Deportiu. After two years with CF Reus Deportiu, he later played for Kadji Sports Academy, FC Koper and Union Douala, before signing for Eding Sport in 2018.

== International career ==
Eto'o was called up to the Cameroon national football team, and made his professional debut in a 2–0 2018 African Nations Championship qualification win over Sao Tome and Principe on 12 August 2017. He earned 3 caps for the national team.
