= ETO =

ETO may refer to:

== Science, technology and medicine ==
- Emitter turn off thyristor, a semiconductor device
- Estimated Time to Ovulation
- Ethylene oxide, an organic compound
- RUNX1T1, a gene
- Efforts To Outcomes, software produced by Social Solutions

== Sports ==
- ETO-SZESE Győr FKC, a Hungarian handball club
- Győri Audi ETO KC, a Hungarian women's handball club
- ETO Park, a multi-use stadium in Győr, Hungary
- Stadion ETO, the predecessor of ETO Park

== Other ==
- Electro-technical officer, on a merchant ship
- Engineer to order, in supply chain management
- English Touring Opera, an opera company in the United Kingdom
- Eton language, a Bantu language
- European Theatre of Operations, the European theatre of World War II
- European Theater of Operations, United States Army, an American theater of operations in World War II
- Earth-Trisolaris Organization, an organization in the novel The Three-Body Problem

== See also ==
- Eto, a Japanese name
