= Cassian Bilton =

British actor

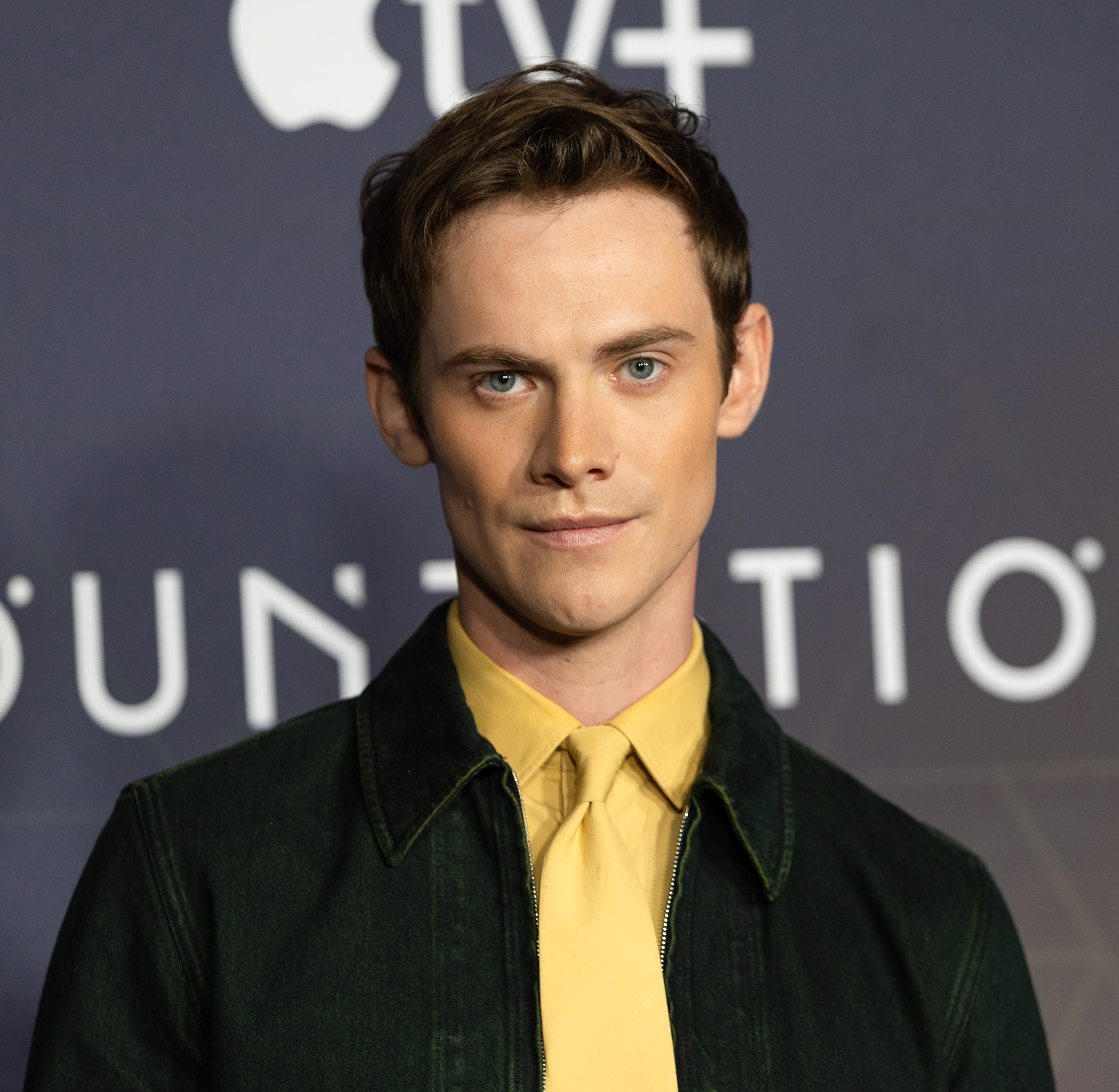
- Bilton in 2025
- Born: London, England
- Education: University of Oxford
- Occupation: Actor
- Years active: 2019–present
- Notable work: Foundation

Cassian Bilton is a British actor best known for portraying Brother Dawn in the Apple TV+ science fiction series Foundation.

== Early life and education ==
Bilton studied philosophy and theology at the University of Oxford. He was a member of Regent's Park College. While at Oxford, he performed in many plays and was president of the Experimental Theatre Club. Before graduating in 2017, Bilton played Oliver in As You Like It in the Sam Wanamaker Playhouse at Shakespeare's Globe.

== Career ==
Bilton portrayed Kornitzer in the 2019 short film The Devil's Harmony, which won the 2020 Sundance Film Festival Short Film Jury Award for International Fiction. He also appeared as Connor in the 2020 short film Shoal, which was nominated for a BAFTA Student Film Award, and long-listed for Best Short Film at the British Independent Film Awards.

Bilton has portrayed Brother Dawn in the Apple TV+ series Foundation since 2021. In November 2025, it was reported that Bilton had joined the cast of Tom Ford's next film, an adaptation of the Anne Rice novel Cry to Heaven.

== Filmography ==
Year	Title	Role	Notes
2019	The Devil's Harmony	Kornitzer	Short film
2020	Shoal	Connor	Short film
2021–present	Foundation	Brother Dawn	Main role
2025	House of Guinness	Michael	
TBA	Cry to Heaven †	TBA	Post-production

Key
†	Denotes films that have not yet been released

== Personal life ==
Bilton is based in London and has expressed interests in visual arts and music.
