= Etienne Eto'o (footballer, born 1990) =

Cameroonian footballer (born 1990)

Personal information
- Full name: Etienne Emmanuel Eto'o Fils
- Date of birth: 17 March 1990 (age 36)
- Place of birth: Yaoundé, Cameroon
- Height: 1.78 m (5 ft 10 in)
- Position: Striker

Youth career
- Kadji Sports Academy

Senior career*
Years	Team	Apps	(Gls)
2006–2009	Mallorca B	48	(23)
2007	→ La Salle (loan)	16	(11)
2009–2011	Gimnàstic	0	(0)
2010–2011	Pobla Mafumet	11	(6)
2011–2012	FC Lustenau	8	(1)
Total		83	(41)
- * Club domestic league appearances and goals

Etienne Emmanuel Eto'o Fils (born 17 March 1990) is a Cameroonian former professional footballer who played as a striker.

Eto'o started his career at RCD Mallorca's B team, before going out on a loan spell to La Salle, where he scored 11 goals in 16 games. After spending time with Gimnàstic, Pobla Mafumet and FC Lustenau, he retired in 2012.

== Club career ==
Eto'o began his career with Real Mallorca and has also played on loan for S.D. La Salle in 2007, after six months turned back to Real Mallorca. After several years with RCD Mallorca was released in summer 2009 and signed on 1 December 2009 for Gimnàstic de Tarragona, but on 11 January 2010 left his club on loan to CF Pobla de Mafumet.

In August 2011 he signed a one-year contract at FC Lustenau in Austria. At his first appearance he scored a goal only two minutes after his substitution. In February 2012 he left the club. He left the club in February 2012, and retired from football afterwards.

== International career ==
He represented Africa in the 2007 Meridian Cup.

== Personal life ==
He is the younger brother of striker Samuel Eto'o. He also has another older brother, David Eto'o. He also holds a Spanish passport.
