= The Mule (Foundation) =

Fictional character from the Foundation series by Isaac Asimov

- Foundation character
- The Mule in disguise as Magnifico Giganticus, as depicted on the 1986 US reprint cover of Foundation and Empire. Art by Michael Whelan.
- First appearance: "The Mule" (1945)
- Last appearance: Second Foundation (1953)
- Created by: Isaac Asimov
- Portrayed by: Mikael Persbrandt (2023); Pilou Asbæk (2025); Synnøve Karlsen (true identity); Foundation
- Voiced by: Wolfe Morris (1973); The Foundation Trilogy

In-universe information
- Species: Mutant human
- Gender: Male
- Occupation: Dictator
- Affiliation: Union of Worlds

The Mule is a fictional character in the Foundation series by Isaac Asimov. First appearing in the 1945 novella "The Mule", he is a mutant and telepath who seizes control of the galaxy as a dictator after the fall of the Galactic Empire. Though he conquers the Foundation, his obsession with destroying the Second Foundation proves to be his undoing in the 1948 novella "Now You See It...".

The Mule is voiced by Wolfe Morris in the 1973 BBC Radio 4 adaptation The Foundation Trilogy. He is portrayed by Mikael Persbrandt in season two of the 2021 Apple TV+ television series adaptation Foundation, and is played by Pilou Asbæk in season three.

== Literature ==
The Mule first appeared in the novella "The Mule", published in the November and December 1945 issues of Astounding Science Fiction. It was later paired with the April 1945 novella "The General", and published as Foundation and Empire in 1952. The Mule next appeared in "Now You See It...", published in the January 1948 issue of Astounding Science Fiction. It was renamed "Part I: Search by the Mule" and published as Second Foundation (1953), paired with "Part II: Search by the Foundation", which had itself been previously published as "...And Now You Don't" in the November and December 1949 and January 1950 issues of Astounding.

=== Description ===
The Mule is a powerful mentalic and conqueror who uses his psychic abilities to manipulate people's emotions and bring planet after planet under his control. He is a random element not foreseen by psychohistory, a science developed by Hari Seldon which uses sophisticated mathematics and statistical analysis to predict future trends on a galactic scale. Posing as a clown named Magnifico Giganticus who is escaping the Mule, he is described by Asimov as "spindly", with "long, lean limbs and spidery body" that seemed "thrown together at random." John Folk-Williams called him a "strange, gangly creature" who speaks "in rather contorted, vaguely literary language."

Josh Wimmer and Alasdair Wilkins of Gizmodo wrote that the Mule's mutant ability to control the emotions of others and convert his enemies to loyal followers makes him basically invincible to all opponents and unpredictable to Hari Seldon's plans. They noted that in "The Mule", he subtly controls the emotions of everyone except for Bayta Darell, "the sole person in the entire galaxy who, of her own volition, treated him like a person ... and that of course was his undoing." Combining his psychic abilities with a Visi-Sonor, a rare, multi-keyed musical instrument that produces holographic visual effects as well as music, allows him to influence and essentially brainwash populations. He employs this method to sow despair throughout the Foundation homeworld Terminus and the Trader planet Haven, and to kill the nobles in Neotrantor, the last bastion of Imperial rule.

Jeffrey Speicher of Collider explained that very little is known about why the Mule is so malevolent, adding that he "is only interested in pillaging and plundering ... and is a master of deception." Though unsatisfied by the level of emotional impact resulting from Asimov's depiction of the Mule's psychic manipulation of others, Wimmer and Wilkins wrote that "the big twist about the Mule, his identity, and his powers makes good sense from a narrative perspective". They also argued that until psychologist Ebling Mis dies, it seems like the Mule's conquest of the Foundation "wouldn't be so awful", but afterward "it hits home just how awful things are, just how terribly the Mule has disturbed the order of things." Folk-Williams wrote, "The Mule, at least early on, comes across as a figure of some complexity, burdened by loneliness and self-doubt, as well as possessing deep insight into the people around him. But all that falls away as he pursues his plans of conquest and meets his match in the First Speaker." Don Kaye of Den of Geek described the Mule as enigmatic, elusive and "obsessed with finding the Second Foundation, which he fears could defeat him." Wimmer and Wilkins explained that in "Search by the Mule", "[The Mule] reigns in mild but constant paranoia, hiding, sure that the Second Foundation is maneuvering against him in secret, to knock him off his throne and restore Hari Seldon's plan for a Second Galactic Empire."

=== Foundation and Empire ===
In "The Mule", a mysterious figure called the Mule has conquered the planet Kalgan with no military force and no resistance from the Kalganians. Foundation-aligned newlyweds Bayta and Toran Darell investigate, soon leaving Kalgan with the Mule's fugitive court jester, Magnifico Giganticus, a "strange, gangly creature" who speaks "in rather contorted, vaguely literary language." The Galactic Empire has collapsed and the Foundation is the dominant power in the galaxy, but its leadership has become complacent, and it falls quickly to the Mule. The Darells and elder Foundation scholar Ebling Mis escape with Magnifico to find the rumored Second Foundation, their only hope to stop the Mule. At what remains of the Great Library of Trantor, Mis works tirelessly to discover clues to the secret location of the Second Foundation. Dying, Mis announces that he knows where the Second Foundation is. Bayta kills him before he can reveal the location, having just realized that Magnifico is the Mule, who seeks the Second Foundation so he can destroy it. He is a mutant who can sense and manipulate the emotions of others, an ability he has employed to conquer planets bloodlessly, to "convert" Foundation intelligence officer Han Pritcher into a loyal agent, and to compel Mis to work himself to death. The Mule promises to find and destroy the Second Foundation, the only threat to his eventual reign over the entire galaxy, but Bayta asserts that it has already prepared for him, and will react before he has time to stop it.

=== Second Foundation ===
"Part I: Search by the Mule" finds the Mule still searching for the elusive Second Foundation. He sends Pritcher on a sixth attempt, this time accompanied by Bail Channis, the only one of the Mule's followers who is "Unconverted", or not influenced by the Mule's psychic powers to serve him. The Mule tells Pritcher this will be an advantage to their quest, but he actually believes that Channis is a Second Foundation agent who intends to lead the Mule into a trap. Secretly followed by the Mule and his fleet, Channis leads the search to the desolate planet Tazenda, a plausible location for the Second Foundation. Pritcher guesses correctly that Channis is a Second Foundation agent. Channis possesses a psychic ability similar to the Mule's, and uses it to free Pritcher from the Mule's control. The Mule appears, and reveals that his fleet has destroyed Tazenda. The Mule uses mental torture to extract the true location of the Second Foundation from Channis's mind, but the First Speaker of the Second Foundation arrives and informs the Mule that he has been defeated. While the Mule has been focused on Channis, Second Foundation agents have traveled to Kalgan and the Foundation worlds to undo the Mule's Conversions and orchestrate an insurrection, and his fleet is too far away to prevent it. When the Mule experiences a moment of despair, the First Speaker is able to seize control of and alter his mind: he will return to Kalgan and live out the rest of his life as a peaceful despot.

== Adaptations ==
=== Radio ===
Magnifico/The Mule is voiced by Wolfe Morris in episodes five, six and seven of the 1973 BBC Radio 4 adaptation The Foundation Trilogy.

=== Television ===
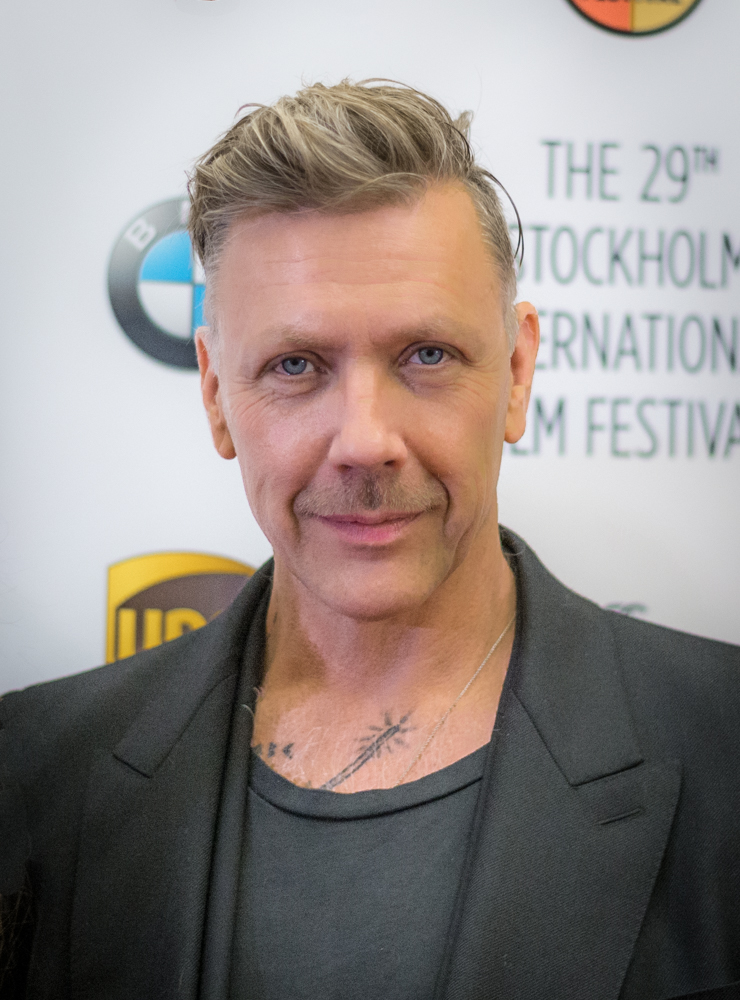
Mikael Persbrandt portrayed the Mule in season two of the 2021 TV series.

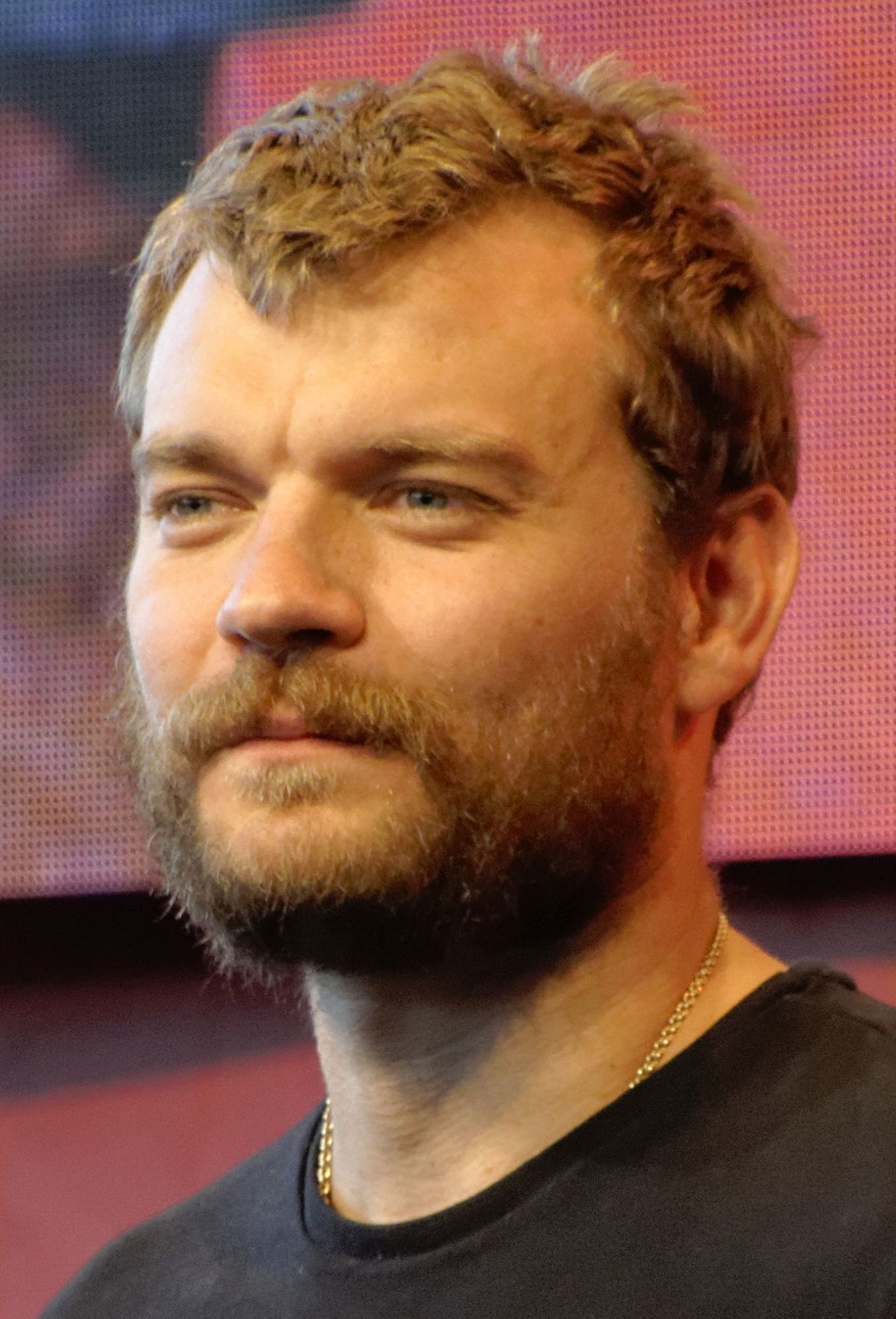
Pilou Asbæk portrayed the Mule in season three of the 2021 TV series.

The Mule is portrayed briefly by Mikael Persbrandt in season two of the 2021 Apple TV+ television series adaptation Foundation. Determined to destroy the Foundation and kill Salvor Hardin, he is described as "a monster of a man, coiled with muscle and possessing powerful psychic abilities, and fueled by hate in his quest to take over the galaxy." Speicher described the Mule as a "mentally unstable telepath who is both calculating and barbaric." In the 2023 episode "A Glimpse of Darkness", Gaal Dornick has a vision of herself in a fiery, post-apocalyptic far future with bombs exploding around her. Salvor Hardin lies dead, and a man, wearing goggles, recognizes Gaal and attacks her with an energy weapon. He disarms her before she can retaliate, lifts her in the air by the throat and asks "Where are your Mentalics? Where is the Second Foundation?". He also mentions Hober Mallow as an enemy of the Empire before Gaal is pulled out of the vision. Hardin is killed saving Dornick in the season two finale "Creation Myths", and the conflict of this with Dornick's previous vision, in which Hardin is killed by the Mule 152 years later, illustrates to Dornick and Hari Seldon that the future can be changed. In the future, the Mule shouts "I must kill Gaal Dornick! I must kill her before she kills me!"

The Mule was recast with Pilou Asbæk for season three. Additionally, Magnifico is portrayed by Tómas Lemarquis.

Series executive producer David S. Goyer said that the arrival of the Mule was always inevitable, but he held off until the second season, telling Apple TV+ executives, "We need to earn The Mule." Sean T. Collins of Decider called the introduction of the character "one of the show's most long-awaited moments". Speicher wrote that the Mule's appearances in season two "hinted at his barbaric nature and unpredictability, promising a more violent and raw antagonist" for season three. Goyer said of the character, “Yes, he is super scary. He's magnitudes of order more powerful than Tellem. When Asimov created [the Mule], it was a character that flipped the whole table over. When the Mule enters the story properly in season three, that’s completely what he does".
