= Salvor Hardin =

Fictional character from the Foundation series by Isaac Asimov

- Foundation character
- Leah Harvey as the gender-flipped Salvor Hardin in the 2021 television series
- First appearance: "Foundation" (1942)
- Created by: Isaac Asimov
- Portrayed by: Leah Harvey; Foundation (2021–2023)
- Voiced by: Lee Montague; The Foundation Trilogy (1973)

In-universe information
- Occupation: Literature: Mayor of Terminus; TV series: Warden of Terminus
- Affiliation: Foundation
- Relatives: TV series: Gaal Dornick (mother); Raych Foss (father); Mari Hardin (foster mother); Abbas Hardin (foster father)

Salvor Hardin is a fictional character in the Foundation series by Isaac Asimov. Introduced in the 1942 short story "Foundation", he is the first mayor of Terminus, the home planet of the Foundation. He defuses a potential political crisis with four nearby barbarian planets, while also securing their dependence on the Foundation. Hardin takes advantage of this power in "Bridle and Saddle" (1942) when one of the planets, Anacreon, declares war on the Foundation.

Hardin is voiced by Lee Montague in the 1973 BBC Radio 4 adaptation The Foundation Trilogy. A gender-flipped and expanded version of the character is portrayed by Leah Harvey in the 2021 Apple TV+ television series adaptation Foundation.

== Literature ==
Salvor Hardin appears in the short stories "Foundation", published in the May 1942 issue of Astounding Science Fiction, and "Bridle and Saddle", published in the June 1942 issue. They were renamed "The Encyclopedists" and "The Mayors", paired with three other stories and published as Foundation in 1951.

=== Description ===
Josh Wimmer and Alasdair Wilkins of Gizmodo described Hardin as "a staggeringly brilliant politician" and "a lively, independent thinker who has a solid grasp on reality", in contrast with the Foundation's encyclopedists, whom they characterize as "pedantic academics with no grip on the real world". They wrote that though Hardin does not believe in the religious culture established on Anacreon, he does not "think any less of the believers or wish them any harm" and recognizes religion as "the best way of doing some good at a time when science has become tainted with the Empire's failure." He employs Foundation priests to bring new planets into this new empire, whereas future leaders like Hober Mallow use business deals to resolve crises and form alliances. Wimmer and Wilkins placed Hardin on their "short list for Asimov's best characters", and explained:

"The Mayors" is helped immeasurably by the presence of that magnificent bastard Salvor Hardin ... It's tricky to pull off a character who is so consciously meant to be larger-than-life—the constant cigar-chomping, the endless epigramming, the ceaseless seat-tilting–but I think Asimov nails it with Hardin. It's fascinating watching Hardin try to joust not just with his enemies on Terminus and in the Four Kingdoms, but with Hari Seldon himself, as he tries to outmaneuver the father of psychohistory and save Terminus from two crises.

Wimmer and Wilkins wrote that Hardin and Limmar Ponyets, the main character of the story "The Traders", "let the bad guys accumulate all this power, and then ever so deftly turn it back against them", but described Ponyets's blackmail of an ambitious politician as "lame" compared to "the operatic scope of Hardin's secret plan in 'The Mayors'." They added:

What makes Salvor Hardin so charming—it's that just when it looks like he's been utterly defeated, he ... unleashes a tidal wave of simply unimaginable ownage. He shuts off an entire planet, takes down the entire command structure of the Anacreon military, humiliates King Lepold in front of his people by switching off his godly powers, gets his enemy's priggish son bloodied and beaten by a bunch of scared soldiers, reduces the ridiculously named Prince Wienis to a whimpering mess, all without lifting a finger—and then, for good measure, drives the evil Wienis to suicide with nothing but a weird fable and a force field ... Hardin doesn't really need a backstory ... when his schemes are that ingenious.

=== "Foundation" ===
In "Foundation", Salvor Hardin is the first mayor of Terminus City, the primary settlement on Terminus. The planet is the home of the Foundation, an organization dedicated to the predictive science of psychohistory, invented by famed mathematician and psychologist Hari Seldon. Hardin believes Terminus is in danger of political exploitation by the four neighboring prefectures of the Empire. Identifying the kingdom of Anacreon as the most powerful of the four, Hardin visits the others and convinces them that they must resist nuclear power from falling to Anacreon alone. The three issue a joint ultimatum that all be allowed to receive nuclear technology from Terminus City, ensuring that the Foundation is indispensable to all.

=== "The Mayors" ===
In "The Mayors", Anacreon launches a direct military assault against Terminus using an abandoned Imperial battlecruiser. Hardin secretly installs a kill switch into the cruiser, causing the crew to mutiny. Maddened by this failure, Prince Regent Wienis of Anacreon orders Hardin's execution, but his royal guardsmen refuse to obey him. He then attempts, but fails, to kill Hardin himself.

== Adaptations ==
=== Radio ===
Hardin is voiced by Lee Montague in episode two "The Mayors" of the 1973 BBC Radio 4 adaptation The Foundation Trilogy.

=== Television ===
A gender-flipped and expanded version of Hardin is portrayed by Leah Harvey in the 2021 Apple TV+ television series adaptation Foundation. Harvey's casting was announced in December 2019. Hardin is the Warden and protector of Terminus, 35 years after Seldon's trial.

==== Season 1 ====
In the 2021 episode "The Mathematician's Ghost", Warden Hardin is disturbed to find that the "null field" around Hari Seldon's mysterious Vault, which repels all life and seemingly protects the Vault, has suddenly expanded. She is a second-generation colonist who possesses a unique resistance to the field. As ships approach from the planet Anacreon, a violation of Imperial sanctions, Hardin finds herself surrounded by an advance ground party of Anacreons. Hardin outwits the Anacreons and captures their leader, Grand Huntress Phara Keaen, in "Barbarians at the Gate", but Keaen manages to escape and disables Terminus City's defenses from the inside in "Upon Awakening".

In "Death and the Maiden", the Anacreons round up colonists with the skills necessary to repair and crew the Invictus, a long-lost Imperial warship that Keaen plans to use to attack the Empire. Hardin has a vision of Seldon's death which reveals to her that Raych Foss killed Seldon on his own orders, and that the escape pod taken by Gaal Dornick had been intended for Raych. Hardin and her lover, the Thespin trader Hugo Crast, are captured by the Anacreons. They bring Hardin, Crast and the colonists aboard the Invictus in "Mysteries and Martyrs", and after several casualties they manage to circumvent the security protocols and reach the bridge in "The Missing Piece". As Hardin fights Keaen and Crast's Thespin allies arrive, the Invictus jumps into the unknown.

The ship appears over Terminus in "The First Crisis", and Hardin is reunited with Crast. The Vault's null field has enveloped the entire planet, but Hardin solves its puzzle and the Vault becomes a portal. Hardin proposes they use Invictus to give all three worlds leverage against the Empire, and kills Keaen before she can destroy the Vault. Seldon emerges from the portal. In the season one finale episode "The Leap", Seldon reveals that the true intent of the Foundation is to create a new civilization assisted by Anacreon and Thespis. Months later, Hardin learns that she is the biological daughter of Dornick and Foss, and realizes that her visions are their memories. She leaves Terminus in search of Dornick. Years later, Dornick lands on her home planet, the ocean world Synnax, and finds another pod underwater, containing Hardin in stasis. Awakened, Hardin tells Dornick she is her daughter, and gives her Seldon's Prime Radiant device.

==== Season 2 ====
In season two, Hardin and Dornick determine that Seldon's plan is off course, and he explains that reviving the interrupted Second Foundation is the solution. Dornick has a vision of Hardin's death at the hands of a mysterious telepath, the Mule, 150 years in the future. In "The Sighted and the Seen", Hardin, Dornick and Seldon arrive at Ignis, where Hardin is seemingly reunited with Crast. He is revealed to be an illusion created by a Mentalic, or telepath, and the trio are taken before the leader of the Mentalic community, Tellem Bond. Bond has established a refuge to save Mentalics from persecution throughout the galaxy. She welcomes Dornick and her precognitive talents in "Why the Gods Made Wine", but is resistant to Seldon and the idea of the Second Foundation. Seldon is suspicious of Bond, and appears to leave the planet, but in actuality he has been captured and slowly drowned at Bond's command.

In "A Necessary Death", Hardin remains suspicious of the Mentalics' motives and Seldon's sudden departure. She discovers his drowned body, but is caught by Bond and rendered unconscious, floating face-down in a pool of seawater. In "The Last Empress", Bond prepares to transfer her consciousness from her dying body into a captive Dornick, but Hardin appears and saves Dornick in "Long Ago, Not Far Away" Seldon is also alive, and kills Bond. Another Mentalic controlled by Bond's psyche attempts to kill Dornick in "Creation Myths", but Hardin dies taking the bullet meant for Dornick. The conflict with Dornick's previous vision of Hardin's death illustrates to Seldon and Dornick that the future can be changed after all. They decide to enter cryosleep, and awaken periodically to keep the Second Foundation on track.

Goyer said that Hardin's death was originally planned for the end of season three, but while writing season two it was decided that killing the character earlier would be a stronger creative choice that would move the story forward. He said that though he loved the character, "I thought it would be surprising, and I thought her death would be meaningful because one of the themes that we've been exploring in the show, it seems like psychohistory predicting a probable future because conditions can change, you know? That the Empire can fall on this date or the Empire can fall on that date. So it's not a deterministic future, it's a probable future."
