= The Foundation Trilogy (radio series) =

BBC Radio 4 radio audiobooks

- Genre: Radio drama
- Country of origin: United Kingdom
- Language: English
- Home station: BBC Radio 4
- Hosted by: Patrick Tull (1–4); Mike Scott (5–8)
- Directed by: David Cain
- Original release: 6 May – 24 June 1973
- No. of series: 1
- No. of episodes: 8

The Foundation Trilogy is a radio series that was broadcast weekly on BBC Radio 4 as eight hour-long episodes between 6 May and 24 June 1973. It is an adaptation of Isaac Asimov's Foundation trilogy of science fiction novels. Patrick Tull presented the first four episodes while Mike Stott presented the last four. David Cain directed the series. The series was repeated in 1977 and 2002.

== Episodes ==
No.	Title	Directed by	Presenter	Original release date
1	"Psychohistory and Encyclopedia"	David Cain	Patrick Tull	6 May 1973
The opening episode begins on Trantor, capital of the Galactic Empire, with the meeting of Hari Seldon and Gaal Dornick, their trial, and their exile to Terminus. The action then jumps forward fifty years, to the first Seldon Crisis, where the repercussions of the recent independence of the Four Kingdoms of the Periphery are being felt on Terminus, and are handled by the first Mayor, Salvor Hardin.
2	"The Mayors"	David Cain	Patrick Tull	13 May 1973
The scene moves forward a further twenty years, as Mayor Hardin faces down the domination of the nearby and most powerful of the Four Kingdoms, Anacreon, whose ruler intends to annex the Foundation by force.
3	"The Merchant Princes"	David Cain	Patrick Tull	20 May 1973
A hundred and fifty years after the Foundation was established, the now powerful trading nation, guided by master trader Hober Mallow, faces its greatest threat to date.
4	"The General"	David Cain	Patrick Tull	27 May 1973
Two hundred years after its creation, the Foundation battles Bel Riose, the last powerful General of the dying Galactic Empire.
5	"The Mule"	David Cain	Mike Scott	3 June 1973
A further hundred years have passed, and the Foundation is challenged by an unexpected threat named The Mule.
6	"Flight From The Mule"	David Cain	Mike Scott	10 June 1973
During the war against The Mule, with things going badly for the Foundation, some key figures under the leadership of the Foundation's greatest scientist, Ebling Mis, flee Terminus in search of the Second Foundation, to warn it of the danger from The Mule.
7	"The Mule Finds"	David Cain	Mike Scott	17 June 1973
The Mule attempts to find and overthrow the Second Foundation.
8	"Star's End"	David Cain	Mike Scott	24 June 1973
Sixty years later a teenage girl is at the centre of the Foundation's renewed search for the Second Foundation.

== Cast ==
- Nigel Anthony as Prince Dagobert
- Geoffrey Beevers as Gaal Dornick
- Douglas Blackwell as Onum Barr and The Governor (Rossem)
- Robin Browne as Jaim Twer and Orum Palley
- Heron Carvic as Advocate
- Maurice Denham as Ebling Mis
- William Eedle as Hari Seldon
- Trader Faulkner as Bail Channis
- William Fox as Poly Verisof and Cleon II
- Sarah Frampton as Arkady Darell
- Martin Friend as Ammel Broderig
- Julian Glover as Hober Mallow
- David Gooderson as Tech-man
- Nigel Graham as Franssart
- Brian Haines as Tomaz Sutt and Huxlani
- Michael Harbour as Lathan Devers
- Ronald Herdman as Sennett Forell and Elder (Rossem)
- Ronald Herdman as Lord Dorwin
- Carleton Hobbs as Dr Toran Darell II
- John Hollis as Yohan Lee
- Dinsdale Landen as Bel Riose
- Peter Howell as Ducem Barr
- Anthony Jackson as Jorane Sutt
- Hayden Jones as First trader
- John Justin as Han Pritcher
- Fraser Kerr as Comdor Asper and Meirus
- Michael Kilgarriff as Theo Aporat, Lieutenant Vrank and Tubor
- Rolf Lefebvre as Anselm Rodric and Dagobert IX
- David March as Homir Munn
- Gail MacFarlane as Commdora Licia
- Lee Montague as Salvor Hardin
- Wolfe Morris as Magnifico
- Katherine Parr as Mrs Palver
- Angela Pleasence as Bayta Darell
- Peter Pratt as Lord Stettin
- John Rowe as Jord Fara and Student Planner (Second Foundation)
- John Ruddock as Second trader, Mayor Indbur III and Elder (Rossem)
- John Samson as Sef Sermak
- Prunella Scales as Lady Callia
- Terry Scully as King Lepold I and Oval
- Cyril Shaps as Preem Palver
- William Sleigh as Doktor Walto
- Roy Spencer as Lewis Pirenne
- Lewis Stringer as Randu
- David Valla as Encyclopedia Galactica Read-out
- Gary Watson as Toran Darell
- Peter Williams as Ankor Jael
- Francis de Wolff as Prince Regent Wienis
- Gabriel Woolf as Pelleas Anthor

== Changes from the novels ==
- The conflict between The Foundation and Anacreon takes place 70 years into the Foundation era; in the novels it occurs in year 80 F.E.
- A small segment entitled "Traders" in the first volume, Foundation, has been removed entirely
- General editing of the timescale has been done throughout
- A large, rather comedic, section about farming on Rossem has been added to "The Mule Finds"
- The leaders of the Second Foundation are referred to as 'Guardian', rather than 'Speaker' as in the books.
