= Gaal Dornick =

Fictional character from the Foundation series by Isaac Asimov

- Foundation character
- Lou Llobell as the gender-flipped Gaal Dornick in the 2021 television series
- First appearance: Foundation (1951)
- Created by: Isaac Asimov
- Portrayed by: Lou Llobell; Foundation (2021–present)
- Voiced by: Geoffrey Beevers; The Foundation Trilogy (1973)

In-universe information
- Occupation: Mathematician
- Affiliation: Foundation; TV series: Seer Church
- Relatives: TV series: Bayla (mother); Jarko (father); Salvor Hardin (daughter)

Gaal Dornick is a fictional character in the Foundation series by Isaac Asimov. Introduced in Foundation (1951), he is a gifted young mathematician from a remote world who becomes embroiled in the conflict surrounding famed mathematician and psychologist Hari Seldon and his predictive science of psychohistory.

Dornick is voiced by Geoffrey Beevers in the 1973 BBC Radio 4 adaptation The Foundation Trilogy. A gender-flipped and expanded version of the character is portrayed by Lou Llobell in the 2021 Apple TV+ television series adaptation Foundation.

== Literature ==
Introduced in Foundation (1951) in the story "The Psychohistorians", Gaal Dornick is a gifted young mathematician, newly awarded his doctorate, who has been invited to the Imperial capital planet Trantor from his home planet Synnax by famed mathematician and psychologist Hari Seldon. Seldon has developed the science of psychohistory, which uses sophisticated mathematics and statistical analysis to predict future trends on a galactic scale. Knowing that Dornick is possibly the only person in the galaxy capable of fully understanding his work, Seldon reveals his prediction of the unavoidable and relatively imminent fall of the Galactic Empire. He has conceived a plan, in which Dornick's participation is crucial, to mitigate the duration of this societal collapse. Under surveillance by agents of the Committee of Public Safety since his arrival, Dornick is arrested and interrogated. As orchestrated by Seldon, he and his followers are exiled to the distant planet Terminus, where he intends to execute this plan by establishing the Foundation.

Describing "The Psychohistorians" as "28 pages of nonstop world-building", Josh Wimmer and Alasdair Wilkins of Gizmodo wrote that "the ostensible protagonist, Gaal Dornick, is such a non-entity that he barely even counts as an audience identification figure".

The prequel novel Forward the Foundation (1993) notes, via entries of the fictional Encyclopedia Galactica, that Dornick carries the Crisis tapes recorded by Seldon to Terminus. There he oversees the construction and installation of the Time Vault. Dornick relocates to Terminus immediately prior to Seldon's death, and inherits Seldon's own version of the Prime Radiant, a device which stores the entirety of his psychohistorical equations.

== Adaptations ==
=== Radio ===
Dornick is voiced by Geoffrey Beevers in episode one "Psychohistory and Encyclopedia" of the 1973 BBC Radio 4 adaptation The Foundation Trilogy.

=== Television ===
A gender-flipped and expanded version of Dornick is portrayed by Lou Llobell in the 2021 Apple TV+ television series adaptation Foundation. Llobell's casting was announced in December 2019. Dornick is a mathematical prodigy from the ocean world Synnax, where science and mathematics are considered heresy, and forbidden. Tara Bennett of Syfy described Dornick as "the audience's avatar into the complex world of the Galactic Empire. In season one, Teyarnie Galea portrays Dornick at age nine.

==== Season 1 ====
In the premiere episode "The Emperor's Peace", Dornick comes to the Imperial capital planet, Trantor, having solved a complex mathematic proof that had been unsolved for over five hundred years. Famed mathematician and psychologist Hari Seldon had devised a competition to solve it to find another mathematical genius who could understand his work on psychohistory. Seldon and Dornick are subsequently arrested and put on trial, Seldon for his calculations of the Empire's fall and Dornick for corroborating them. They are sentenced to death, but granted a reprieve in the aftermath of a devastating terrorist attack that kills millions. During the multi-year journey to the remote planet Terminus to establish Seldon's repository of human knowledge in "Preparing to Live", Dornick and Raych Foss, Seldon's handsome protégé, have begun a romantic relationship, and Seldon disapproves. While Seldon values science and detachment, Dornick is open to emotion and human relationships. In the middle of her daily swimming ritual, Dornick has a sudden urge to seek out Seldon, and stumbles upon Foss stabbing him to death. Foss ushers her into an escape pod, hands her the murder weapon and jettisons her from the ship.

Dornick awakens from cryosleep 34 year later, aboard an automated starship prepared by Foss, in "Upon Awakening". He has been executed for Seldon's murder, and she is believed to be an accomplice. A digital, holographic copy of Seldon's consciousness, stored in the knife Foss used to kill him, explains himself to Dornick in "Mysteries and Martyrs". Afflicted with a rapidly escalating neurological disorder, he had planned to commit suicide to preserve his followers' devotion to his genius, while Dornick helped establish the Foundation on Terminus and Foss was to take the digital Seldon elsewhere. Foss and Dornick's unexpected relationship had jeopardized this plan, so Seldon had convinced Foss to kill him as the only way to guarantee Dornick's future, but in fact to force their separation. Foss had foiled this plan as well by sending Dornick off in the escape pod intended for him. Dornick is furious with Seldon, while realizing that she had been drawn to the murder scene by some latent psychic ability. In "The Missing Piece", Seldon explains that Foss was supposed to lead a secret, Second Foundation which Seldon created on his home planet, Helicon, and urges Dornick to let the starship take her there, but refuses to give details. Done with Seldon's manipulations, Dornick instead takes the escape pod on a journey to Synnax that will last 138 years. On Terminus, Warden Salvor Hardin learns that she is the biological daughter of Foss and Dornick in the season one finale episode "The Leap". Dornick lands on Synnax and finds another pod underwater, containing Hardin in stasis. Awakened, Hardin tells Dornick she is her daughter, and then gives her Seldon's Prime Radiant device.

==== Season 2 ====
In season two, Dornick and Hardin determine that Seldon's plan is off course, and digital Seldon explains that reviving the interrupted Second Foundation is the solution. Dornick has a vision of Hardin's death at the hands of a mysterious telepath, the Mule, 150 years in the future, and from her own future memories gleans that the Second Foundation is located on the planet Ignis. Seldon acquires an organic body in "King and Commoner", and in "The Sighted and the Seen" the trio arrives at Ignis, a refuge for Mentalics, or telepaths, led by Tellem Bond. Bond is welcoming to Dornick and her talents in "Why the Gods Made Wine", but resistant to Seldon and the idea of the Second Foundation. After drowning Seldon and Hardin, Bond prepares a captive Dornick as a new host for the transfer of Bond's consciousness from her dying body in "The Last Empress". Having survived in part thanks to Dornick, Seldon and Hardin save her and kill Bond in "Long Ago, Not Far Away". Another Mentalic controlled by Bond's psyche attempts to kill Dornick in "Creation Myths", but Hardin dies taking the bullet meant for Dornick. The conflict with Dornick's previous vision of Hardin's death illustrates to Seldon and Dornick that the future can be changed after all. They decide to enter cryosleep, and awaken periodically to keep the Second Foundation on track. In the future, the Mule vows to destroy Dornick.

==== Reception ====
Daniel Bibby of Screen Rant called Dornick "of the most interesting and powerful Foundation characters".
