= Hober Mallow =

Fictional character from the Foundation series by Isaac Asimov

- Foundation character
- Dimitri Leonidas as Hober Mallow in the TV series (2023)
- First appearance: "The Big and the Little" (1944)
- Created by: Isaac Asimov
- Portrayed by: Dimitri Leonidas; Foundation (2023)
- Voiced by: Julian Glover; The Foundation Trilogy (1973)

In-universe information
- Species: Human
- Gender: Male
- Occupation: Merchant; TV series: Con artist

Hober Mallow is a fictional character in the Foundation series by Isaac Asimov. In the 1944 novella "The Big and the Little", he is a Master Trader for the Foundation who pioneers the use of commerce to increase the Foundation's power and influence across the galaxy.

Mallow is voiced by Julian Glover in the 1973 BBC Radio 4 adaptation The Foundation Trilogy. He is portrayed by Dimitri Leonidas in season two of the 2021 Apple TV+ television series adaptation Foundation.

== Literature ==
Hober Mallow appears in the novella "The Big and the Little", published in the August 1944 issue of Astounding Science Fiction. It was later retitled "The Merchant Princes", collected with four other stories and published as Foundation in 1951.

=== Description ===
Mallow is a successful merchant who brokers deals within the Foundation, and also between their territories and non-Foundation worlds. He is a native of Smyrno, one of the four "barbarian" planetary kingdoms of the Anacreon Province that exist under the Foundation's religious influence, but he dislikes the religion itself. While Mayor Salvor Hardin had previously employed Foundation priests and their Scientism religion to secure the Foundation's influence over local barbaric planets, Mallow believes that this approach has limited use toward the Foundation's greater goal of amassing power across the galaxy. His business dealings have convinced him that commercial relationships are a better strategy to consolidate the Foundation's power. The complacent Foundation leaders initially resist, but Mallow's use of business deals to resolve crises and form alliances eventually proves to be effective.

Marcelo Leite of Screen Rant explained, "Mallow plays a significant role in establishing the Foundation’s power and influence over the galaxy." Josh Wimmer and Alasdair Wilkins of Gizmodo described Mallow as "larger-than-life", and "one of the strangest characters Asimov ever created, a heartless bastard who's described physically more like a particularly intelligent shaved bear than a normal human." He is not a native Foundationer, and is depicted as willing to kill his own crew for disobedience. Wimmer and Wilkins called the character "a good fit for the current mood of space-based science fiction—his ruthlessness in command would be a good match for Admiral Adama's approach on Battlestar Galactica, and his conduct on the Far Star reminded me of the initial, darker characterization of Malcolm Reynolds on Firefly ... he's a character who arguably works even better now than he might have done against some of the more gallant and dashing space captains of the 1940s and 1950s." They also wrote, "The only problem is that Asimov doesn't really give him any weaknesses to go against his strengths—sure, he's a complete bastard, but he's justified in his conduct at every turn."

=== Plot ===
In "The Big and the Little", Hober Mallow is a Master Trader for the Foundation. He and his ship, Far Star, are sent to Korell to investigate the disappearance of three Foundation vessels in the vicinity. A Foundation missionary, Reverend Jord Parma, seeks sanctuary, but Mallow suspects subterfuge and turns Parma over to the Korellians, whose laws forbid Foundation missionaries to be on the planet under penalty of death. Mallow negotiates the sale of Foundation devices to the ruler of Korell, and soon the planet is dependent on them. Mallow is later tried for murder on the Foundation planet Terminus for condemning the missionary to death, but is exonerated when he proves that Parma was actually an agent of the Korellian secret police. Mallow's popularity results in his appointment to Mayor of Terminus. Korell subsequently declares war on the Foundation, and when Mallow imposes an embargo on them, the Korellan economy collapses due to its dependency on Foundation technology, thus forcing its surrender.

== Adaptations ==
=== Radio ===
Mallow is voiced by Julian Glover as in episode three "The Merchant Princes" of the 1973 BBC Radio 4 adaptation The Foundation Trilogy.

=== Television ===
Mallow is portrayed by Dimitri Leonidas in season two of the 2021 Apple TV+ television series adaptation Foundation. He is a roguish trader and con man with a "sarcastic personality and questionable morals, who is summoned against his will to serve a higher, selfless cause."

==== Storyline ====
In the 2023 episode “A Glimpse of Darkness”, Hari Seldon's mysterious Vault on Terminus opens after 138 years. Warden Jaegger Fount approaches, and exclaims "Get Hober Mallow!" before being incinerated. The name "Hober Mallow" is subsequently projected in front of the Vault. In "King and Commoner", Mallow swindles Commdor Argo of Korell, and evades capture alongside High Claric Poly Verisof and Brother Constant of the Foundation's propagandist Church of the Galactic Spirit. Mallow, Verisof and Constant meet with Seldon's digital avatar in the Vault in "Where the Stars are Scattered Thinly", and Seldon recruits Mallow in a scheme against the Empire. Subsequently in "A Necessary Death", Mallow approaches the Empire's navigators, the genetically engineered and cybernetically enhanced Spacers, with an offer to free them from their servitude to the Empire by giving them a synthesized version of the micronutrient opalesk, on which they are dependent. After weighing the risks, the Spacers reject Mallow's offer and turn him over to Imperial General Bel Riose, but he escapes. In "The Last Empress", Mallow saves Constant from execution by the Empire, and they consummate their relationship. In the season two finale "Creation Myths", Mallow's capture is revealed to have been a ruse to smuggle a special jump sequence to She-Bends-Light, a Spacer on Riose's flagship, Shining Destiny. She uses it to program the fleet's warships to jump into one another, which will inevitably destroy them all and free the remaining Spacers from the Empire. Riose battles the Emperor clone Brother Day in hand-to-hand combat, and uses Mallow's castling device to switch places with Day via teleportation, venting the Emperor into space and killing him. Trapped on the doomed flagship, Mallow and Riose share a toast as the Shining Destiny explodes.

==== Reception ====
Sean T. Collins of Decider wrote, "Dimitri Leonidas actually has that roguish Han Solo charm so many actors and characters have tried and failed to recapture." Richard Edwards of Space.com described the character as having "charm to spare". Collins called Mallow's rescue of Constant "legitimately one of the most exciting and sexy acts of swashbuckling" he had seen in years. Jeffrey Speicher of Collider called Mallow "probably the most relatable young male character on the show", and described his relationship with Constant as "the best romantic relationship in Foundation so far." Goyer said that the deaths of Mallow and Riose were always planned for season two, adding that "I like that they meet their fates twinned together".
