= Foundation (TV series) =

2021 American science fiction TV series

- Genre: Drama; Science fiction
- Created by: David S. Goyer; Josh Friedman
- Based on: Foundation by Isaac Asimov
- Starring: Jared Harris; Lee Pace; Lou Llobell; Leah Harvey; Laura Birn; Terrence Mann; Cassian Bilton; Cherry Jones; Brandon P. Bell; Yootha Wong-Loi-Sing; Alexander Siddig; Pilou Asbæk; Synnøve Karlsen; Cody Fern; Troy Kotsur; Tómas Lemarquis
- Composers: Bear McCreary; Sparks & Shadows
- Country of origin: United States
- Original language: English
- No. of seasons: 3
- No. of episodes: 30

Production
- Executive producers: David S. Goyer; David Ellison; Dana Goldberg; Bill Bost; Robyn Asimov; Marcy Ross; Rupert Sanders; Josh Friedman; Cameron Welsh; Alex Graves; Matt Thunell; David Kob; Christopher J. Byrne; Leigh Dana Jackson; Jane Espenson; Roxann Dawson
- Producers: Michael J. Malone; Macdara Kelleher; Tim Southam; Doug Moreno
- Running time: 44–69 minutes
- Production companies: Phantom Four; Skydance Television
- Budget: $45+ million (s. 1)

Original release
- Network: Apple TV+
- Release: September 24, 2021 – September 12, 2025
- Network: Apple TV

Foundation is an American science fiction television series created by David S. Goyer and Josh Friedman for Apple TV+, based on the Foundation series of stories by Isaac Asimov. It features an ensemble cast led by Jared Harris, Lee Pace, Lou Llobell, Leah Harvey, and Laura Birn. The series premiered on September 24, 2021. The second and third seasons were released in July 2023 and July 2025, respectively. In September 2025, the series was renewed for a fourth season.

== Plot ==
In the far future, most of the known galaxy is despotically ruled by a triumvirate of leaders collectively known as Empire: the "genetic dynasty" of clones of the long-deceased Emperor Cleon, which include Brother Day, a Cleon in his prime; Brother Dusk, a retired and aging Cleon who serves in an advisory role; and Brother Dawn, a young Cleon being trained to succeed Brother Day. Unknown beyond the walls of Empire's keep is that the dynasty has been surreptitiously administered for 400 years by the regal Lady Demerzel, Empire's majordomo, secretly a unique, ageless humanoid robot, thought to be the last remnant of an army of robots defeated 6,000 years prior.

Young prodigy Gaal Dornick solves a complex mathematical proof and wins a galaxy-wide contest, devised by famed mathematician and psychology professor Hari Seldon to find another mind capable of understanding his work. Arriving on the capital planet Trantor, Gaal is thrust into the center of a conflict between the Cleonic dynasty and Seldon’s schools regarding the merits of psychohistory, which was created by Seldon to predict the events and actions of large masses of people across vast timelines. With Gaal to verify his findings, Seldon explains and publicly forecasts the decay and imminent fall of the empire, which cannot be averted, but the consequences of which may be mitigated by the creation of a Foundation to preserve the collective knowledge and innovations of humanity. The Cleons are initially dismissive of Seldon, but following the first of a series of predicted catastrophic events leading to the fall, tentatively allow him and his followers to establish the Foundation in exile on the remote planet Terminus. The series chronicles Empire's subsequent conflicts with the flowering Foundation and its allies over the course of the passing centuries, the characters and stories that bridge the divide between them, and how the galaxy's future is imperiled by the one event Seldon's psychohistory fails to predict.

== Cast and characters ==
The main cast (from left to right): Jared Harris as Hariton "Hari" Seldon, Leah Harvey as Salvor Hardin, Lou Llobell as Gaal Dornick, Laura Birn as Demerzel and Lee Pace as Brother Day

=== Main ===
- Jared Harris as Hariton "Hari" Seldon, a mathematician and developer of psychohistory, an algorithmic science that allows him to predict the future in terms of probabilities.
- Lee Pace as Brother Day (Cleon I, XII, XIII, XVI, XVII, XXIV), the middle-aged member of a series of genetic clones of Cleon I, who reigns as Emperor of the 12,000-year-old Galactic Empire. Pace also portrays Cleon I in his prime.
- Lou Llobell as Gaal Dornick, Hari's protégée, a self-taught young woman from Synnax, a planet where the pursuit of knowledge is considered heresy. Teyarnie Galea portrays Gaal as a child.
- Leah Harvey as Salvor Hardin (seasons 1–2), the Warden of Terminus, 35 years after Seldon's trial, hero of the Foundation's first crisis, and Gaal Dornick's daughter.
- Laura Birn as Demerzel, the majordomo to the Emperors and one of the last surviving gynoids from the ancient Robot Wars.
- Terrence Mann as Brother Dusk (Cleon I, XI, XII, XVI, XXIII), the eldest member of a series of genetic clones of Cleon I who retired from his duties as Emperor. Mann also portrays an elderly Cleon I.
- Cassian Bilton as Brother Dawn (Cleon I, XIV, XVIII, XXV), the youngest member of a series of genetic clones of Cleon I and the successor-in-training of Brother Day.
- Cherry Jones as Felice Quent (season 3), the Foundation's ambassador to the Empire, and an old friend of Brother Dusk.
- Brandon P. Bell as Han Pritcher (season 3), the Foundation's captain of information.
- Yootha Wong-Loi-Sing as Song (season 3), Brother Day's consort, who hails from the Mycogen sector of Trantor.
- Alexander Siddig as Dr. Ebling Mis (season 3), a self-taught psychohistorian and diehard fan of Hari Seldon. Siddig also portrays Advocate Xylas, the prosecutor in Seldon's trial, in the first season.
- Pilou Asbæk as the Mule (season 3), a powerful Mentalic seeking conquest over both the Empire and the Foundation. Mikael Persbrandt portrays the Mule during Gaal's visions of the future in the second season.
- Synnøve Karlsen as Bayta Mallow (season 3), a renowned socialite and Toran's wife.
- Cody Fern as Toran Mallow (season 3), a descendant of trader Hober Mallow, and Bayta's husband.
- Troy Kotsur as Preem Palver (season 3), the leader of a colony of Mentalics on the planet Ignis who have evolved into the Second Foundation.
- Tómas Lemarquis as Magnifico Giganticus (season 3), a skilled balladeer and devotee of the Mule.

=== Recurring ===
- Alfred Enoch as Raych Foss (season 1; guest season 2), the adopted son of Hari Seldon
- Jairaj Varsani (season 1; guest season 2) and Kulvinder Ghir (season 2) as High Claric Poly Verisof, Brother Constant's superior and companion, who was a child at the dawn of the Foundation
- Chloe Lea as Gia (season 1), a child on Terminus and friends with Poly, Keir, and Laylo
- Buddy Skelton as Keir Fulham (season 1), a child on Terminus and Laylo's brother
- Joni Morris as Laylo Fulham (season 1), a child on Terminus and Keir's sister
- Mido Hamada as Shadow Master Obrecht (season 1), the Imperial spymaster during Cleon XIII's reign
- Elliot Cowan as Lewis Pirenne (season 1), the Director of the Foundation and first successor of Hari Seldon
- Sasha Behar as Mari Hardin (season 1), a Seldon follower and surrogate mother of Salvor Hardin
- Clarke Peters as Abbas Hardin (season 1), a Seldon follower, the first Warden and first Mayor of Terminus, and surrogate father of Salvor Hardin
- Daniel MacPherson as Hugo Crast (season 1; guest season 2), an interplanetary trader from Thespis who became Salvor Hardin's lover
- Kubbra Sait as Grand Huntress Phara Keaen (season 1), the top military officer of Anacreon who personally leads a raid on Terminus
- Pravessh Rana as Rowan (season 1), Phara's second-in-command
- Christian Contreras as Commander Kray Dorwin (season 1), an Imperial soldier sent to investigate the loss of contact with Terminus
- Amy Tyger as Azura Odili (season 1), an Imperial Palace gardener and love interest of Brother Dawn/Cleon XIV
- Ella-Rae Smith as Queen Sareth (season 2), the ruler of Cloud Dominion and bride-to-be of Brother Day/Cleon XVII
- Sandra Yi Sencindiver as Enjoiner Rue Corintha (season 2), Sareth's retainer and advisor
- Oliver Chris as Director Sef Sermak (season 2), a leader of the Foundation and Brother Constant's father
- Isabella Laughland as Brother Constant (season 2), a novice claric and traveling "magician" spreading the gospel of Hari Seldon
- Dimitri Leonidas as Hober Mallow (season 2), a roguish trader and con man who plays an important role in Seldon's plan
- Ben Daniels as Bel Riose (season 2), an admired general who was imprisoned for disobeying Empire
- Dino Fetscher as Glawen Curr (season 2), Riose's husband and second-in-command
- Judi Shekoni as She-Bends-Light (season 2), a Spacer navigator in Riose's flagship
- Rachel House as Tellem Bond (season 2), the leader of a community of Mentalics on planet Ignis
- Michael Akinsulire as Loron (season 2), a Mentalic and Tellem's chief enforcer
- Sandra Guldberg Kampp as Thalis (season 2; guest season 3), a young Mentalic and member of Tellem's community
- Rebecca Ineson as Zephyr Vorellis (season 3), Demerzel's new confessor and representative of the Luminist faith on Trantor
- Leo Bill as Mayor Trenton Indbur (season 3), the leader of New Terminus
- Darren Pettie as Randu Mallow (season 3), a member of the rebellious Trader faction of the Foundation and uncle of Toran
- Iðunn Ösp Hlynsdóttir as Sephone (season 3), Han Pritcher's colleague and fellow intelligence agent
- Ahir Shah as Zagreus (season 3), a personal aide to Empire
- Miltos Yerolemou as Presider Kinn (season 3), the leader of the Galactic Council
- Ibraheem Toure as Mavon (season 3), a high-ranking Claviger in service to Brother Day
- Isla Gie as Skirlet (season 3), the daughter of the ruler of Kalgan, who is taken prisoner by the Mule
- Krista Kosonen as Fallon Greer (season 3), the Warden of New Terminus
- Laura Berlin as Oceanglass-49 (season 3), Song's partner and a member of the robot-worshipping Inheritance cult

=== Guest ===
- Jade Harrison as Bayla (season 1), Gaal Dornick's mother
- Chris Jarman as Jarko (seasons 1–2), Gaal Dornick's father
- Reece Shearsmith as Jerril (seasons 1–2), an Imperial agent during Cleon XII's reign
- Cooper Carter (season 1) and Cobhan O'Brien (seasons 2–3) as the child Brother Dawn/Cleon I, XIII, XXIV
- Chipo Chung as Reth Linn (season 1), an environment engineer and the voice of the Raven operating system
- Ian McNeice as Master Statistician Tivole (season 1), the head of Empire's team of mathematicians
- T'Nia Miller as Zephyr Halima Ifa (season 1), a senior priestess of the Luminist faith vying to become its next leader
- Nimrat Kaur as Yanna Seldon (season 2), Hari Seldon's deceased life partner
- Holt McCallany as Jaegger Fount (season 2), a Warden of Terminus
- Rowena King as Kalle (seasons 2–3), a mathematician whose work helped Hari Seldon create his Prime Radiant
- Noah Taylor as Hetman (season 2), a bandit on the planet Siwenna
- Jesper Christensen as Ducem Barr (season 2), an Imperial loyalist on Siwenna
- Philip Glenister as Commdor Argo (season 2), the ruler of Korell
- Ed Birch as Keeper Yartell (season 2), the guardian of the Empire's memory archives
- Fiona O'Shaughnessy as Dr. Tadj (season 2), the provost of the University of Helicon
- Ralph Ineson as Archduke Bellarion (season 3), the ruler of Kalgan
- Fisayo Akinade as Eely Karvis (season 3), the chief engineer in charge of creating the Novacula for Brother Dusk
- Vibeke Hastrup as Nee Tellamarus (season 3), a librarian at the Imperial Library on Trantor
- Blake Ritson as Sunmaster-18 (season 3), the spiritual leader of the Inheritance cult
- Ritakahn Chen as Enjoiner Beryl (season 3), the representative of Cloud Dominion on Trantor

== Episodes ==
| Season | Episodes | Originally released | |
| Season | Episodes | First released | Last released |
|---|---|---|---|
| 1 | 10 | September 24, 2021 | November 19, 2021 |
| 2 | 10 | July 14, 2023 | September 15, 2023 |
| 3 | 10 | July 11, 2025 | September 12, 2025 |

=== Season 1 (2021) ===
| No. overall | No. in season | Title | Directed by | Written by | Original release date |
|---|---|---|---|---|---|
| 1 | 1 | "The Emperor's Peace" | Rupert Sanders | David S. Goyer & Josh Friedman | September 24, 2021 |
In the year 12,067 E.I. (Era Imperial), the prodigy Gaal Dornick travels from her academically repressive homeworld of Synnax to Trantor, capital of the Galactic Empire, to study under the famed Hari Seldon, the creator of the predictive mathematical subfield of psychohistory, as a reward for solving a complex conjecture. They are both arrested on charges of treason; Seldon because his model predicts the imminent collapse of the Empire, due in part to the stagnation caused by four centuries of rule by clones of Emperor Cleon I, and Gaal because the Empire wants her to discredit psychohistory. Gaal instead confirms Seldon's model during his trial and condemns them both, but they are spared by Brother Day (Emperor Cleon XII) after the Star Bridge, Trantor's space elevator, is destroyed by apparent terrorists from the feuding Periphery kingdoms of Anacreon and Thespis. Brother Day exiles Seldon and Gaal to the Periphery world of Terminus, where they are to build the "Foundation", a repository of human knowledge that Seldon claims will shorten the dark age after the Empire's demise from thirty thousand years to a single millennium.
| 2 | 2 | "Preparing to Live" | Andrew Bernstein | Josh Friedman & David S. Goyer | September 24, 2021 |
Seldon and his followers proceed to Terminus aboard a slow starship, the Deliverance, and prepare for their new lives on the barren world. A year into the trip (12,068 E.I.), Gaal reveals to her lover, Seldon's adopted son Raych, that the psychohistory model is incomplete, alarming him. Meanwhile, the Empire investigates the Star Bridge attack but is unable to identify its mastermind or conclusively attribute it to Seldon or the governments of Anacreon and Thespis. Despite Brother Dusk (Cleon XI) urging that the detained delegations from the two kingdoms should be granted clemency, Brother Day opts for a public execution of all delegates except the two ambassadors, simultaneous with orbital bombardments of their homeworlds. On the ship, Gaal finds Raych fatally stabbing Seldon in his quarters. Raych then ushers the incredulous Gaal into an escape pod with the murder weapon and jettisons her from the ship.
| 3 | 3 | "The Mathematician's Ghost" | Alex Graves | Olivia Purnell | October 1, 2021 |
Nineteen years after the Star Bridge attack (12,086 E.I.), the genetic dynasty of Cleon I undertakes its traditional transfer of power: Cleon XIV is born as the new Brother Dawn, Cleon XIII is elevated as Brother Day, Cleon XII retires as Brother Dusk, and Cleon XI assumes the mantle of Brother Darkness before being euthanized. In 12,072 E.I., Seldon's followers arrive at Terminus and discover the Vault, an enigmatic artifact guarded by a "null field" that repels all life. In the present day (12,102 E.I.), the Foundation is well established, and Salvor Hardin, a second-generation colonist, serves as Warden of Terminus. Salvor is troubled by the sudden expansion of the Vault's null field, but a larger crisis looms as corvettes from Anacreon appear in Terminus's skies in open violation of Imperial sanctions. In the hours before the ships' arrival, Salvor chases a child into the scuttled Deliverance and finds herself surrounded by an Anacreon landing party.
| 4 | 4 | "Barbarians at the Gate" | Alex Graves | Lauren Bello | October 8, 2021 |
The Cleon lineage faces a threat to its legitimacy as Zephyr Halima Ifa, a leading candidate to become the next Proxima of the major religion of Luminism, revives an orthodox, pre-Imperial dogma that asserts clones of an individual do not possess souls. This religious issue and a violent "Sinker" insurrection in the still-ruined lower levels of Trantor fulfill two key portents of the Empire's decline that Hari Seldon related at his trial. Brother Day grows frustrated with Brother Dusk, feeling his elder seeded these problems decades ago by acting impulsively and refusing to heed Seldon's warnings. While Day departs Trantor to attend the Luminist Conclave and back Zephyr Gilat, Ifa's competitor, Dusk, orders Commander Dorwin to visit the Foundation, which has fallen silent. On Terminus, Salvor outwits the Anacreons and captures their leader, Grand Huntress Phara Keaen, who claims to only want the colony ship's navigation computer so her people can find a new homeworld. Anacreon soldiers surround Terminus City's perimeter fence and assemble a flak cannon. The Vault also begins giving Salvor sporadic visions of a child in Trantor's Imperial Library, where Seldon worked. In deep space, a ship encounters Gaal's escape pod.
| 5 | 5 | "Upon Awakening" | Alex Graves | Leigh Dana Jackson | October 15, 2021 |
In the past, on Synnax, Gaal was forced to participate in the execution of her former teacher, who was caught salvaging books from a condemned university. Disillusioned with the Seer's Church, she educates herself in secret and enters a math competition. In the present, Gaal awakens after 34 years of cryosleep and finds herself aboard the fully automated starship Raven, which had been prepared by Raych. She learns that Raych was executed for murdering Hari, and the galaxy believes her to be an accomplice to the crime. After deducing that the Raven is bound for Hari's homeworld of Helicon, she stumbles across a wounded yet seemingly alive Hari. At Terminus, the Imperial ship Aegis carrying Commander Dorwin, enters orbit and detects the Anacreon presence. Dorwin is informed of the captive Phara and demands to speak with her, causing the Foundation staff to bring her from her cell to Foundation Tower. Once inside, Phara disables Terminus City's fence and reveals that her true purpose is to destroy the Foundation in revenge for the Empire's neutron bombing of Anacreon, which had killed her parents and brother. The Anacreon soldiers storm the city, and their flak cannon shoots down the Aegis.
| 6 | 6 | "Death and the Maiden" | Jennifer Phang | Marcus Gardley | October 22, 2021 |
Brother Day visits The Maiden, the sacred moon of the Luminist faith, and tries to sway public opinion by promising a desalination system in honor of Zephyr Gilat. However, Zephyr Halima gains favor with a powerful eulogy for Proxima Opal that subtly critiques Imperial cloning. On Trantor, Brother Dawn falls for palace gardener Azura Odili and reveals a dangerous secret: he has genetic anomalies like color blindness, unlike previous Cleon clones. Meanwhile, on Terminus, the Anacreons salvage Dorwin from the Aegis wreckage and gather colonists to repair the Invictus, an ancient warship they plan to use against the Empire. Salvor escapes with help from children and attempts to destroy Anacreon corvettes to strand Phara. During the mission, she experiences a vision showing Hari Seldon's death was orchestrated as part of his plan, and that the escape pod Gaal used was meant for Raych. In her absence, Salvor's father Abbas sacrifices himself to destroy the corvettes. Later, Salvor and her lover Hugo are captured by Phara, who forces Salvor to pilot Hugo's ship, the Beggar, to the Anthor Belt with the colonists aboard.
| 7 | 7 | "Mysteries and Martyrs" | Jennifer Phang | Caitlin Saunders | October 29, 2021 |
Salvor and Phara's group boards the ancient warship Invictus, but the mission proves deadly. Hugo is lost during a spacewalk from the Beggar, and Dorwin is killed by Phara after unlocking the ship. With Invictus set to make a random jump that could be fatal, the remaining Anacreons and colonists race to the bridge to seize control. On The Maiden, Brother Day struggles to contain Zephyr Halima's rising influence and attempts to outshine her by undertaking Luminism's holiest pilgrimage. On Trantor, Brother Dawn, haunted by fears of replacement due to his genetic anomalies, considers fleeing with Azura, a palace gardener. Meanwhile, aboard the Raven, Hari Seldon is revealed to be a digital copy of his original consciousness, stored in the knife Raych used to kill him and uploaded when Gaal was found. Hari explains that Gaal and Raych's romance disrupted his plan: Hari was meant to die by suicide to become a mythic figure, Raych to deliver the knife to the Raven, and Gaal to lead the Foundation. Instead, Hari convinced Raych to murder him to separate the couple. Gaal is furious at the manipulation, but her anger is tempered by the revelation of her latent ability: prescience.
| 8 | 8 | "The Missing Piece" | Roxann Dawson | Sarah Nolen | November 5, 2021 |
The group on the Invictus finally reaches the bridge. Hugo safely arrives at a comms relay and calls for help from his people. As the Thespins attack, and Phara and Salvor fight each other, the Invictus jumps into the unknown. On the Raven, Hari divulges his plan to establish a secret second Foundation on Helicon. Gaal forces Hari to let her leave in the escape pod and sets a 138-year course for Synnax. Brother Day completes the Spiral, a torturous trek to a desert cave pool, and claims to have received a vision of a sacred flower from Luminism's triple-goddess. The Zephyrs interpret Day's vision as a divine pronouncement that he has a soul, rendering further criticism of Imperial cloning to be sacrilege, and also guaranteeing Zephyr Gilat's elevation to Proxima. Day seals his victory by commanding Demerzel to assassinate Halima. Demerzel is a devout Luminist and is greatly distressed by the command, but she is compelled to obey. As they leave The Maiden behind, Day reflects on his experience in the cave, revealing he had had no vision, after a tearful Demerzel made clear that she was aware of the deception and disapproved.
| 9 | 9 | "The First Crisis" | Roxann Dawson | Victoria Morrow | November 12, 2021 |
The Invictus appears over Terminus owing to Lewis Pirenne's personal sacrifice. Salvor reunites with Hugo, then descends to Terminus to deactivate the Vault, which has enveloped the planet in its null field. On Trantor, Brother Dawn realizes Brother Dusk knows his secret. He escapes to find Azura, but falls into the waiting hands of a conspiracy. Azura had been part of an anti-Empire group which altered Dawn's DNA, giving him imperfections so that he would one day choose to flee the palace. This was done to create an opportunity to extract his Imperial nanobots and implant them into a cooperative, perfect Cleon clone who would then assume Dawn's identity. As Dawn despairs, Dusk arrives with Imperial troops who dispatch the conspirators and their counterfeit Cleon. Dusk leaves Dawn's fate for the returning Brother Day to decide. On Terminus, Salvor solves the puzzle of the Vault, converting it into a portal. Before the gathered Anacreons, Thespins, and Termini, Salvor proposes harnessing the Invictus to give all three worlds leverage against the Empire. Phara tries to destroy the Vault, but is shot dead. Before further violence can occur, Hari Seldon emerges from the portal.
| 10 | 10 | "The Leap" | David S. Goyer | David S. Goyer | November 19, 2021 |
A second digital copy of Hari explains that the Vault had been his casket, which reached Terminus before the colonists. He reveals the Foundation's true purpose was to forge a new civilization assisted by Anacreon and Thespis. He suggests a ruse to make it appear Terminus had been purged of life, allowing the Outer Reach to develop in secrecy. He informs Salvor that her visions were not sent by him. Later, Salvor learns she was conceived by Gaal and Raych, and realizes her visions are her genetic parents' memories. She leaves in search of Gaal. On Trantor, Brother Day tells Azura he has killed everyone she knows, and sentences her to lifelong sensory deprivation. Day decides to spare Dawn over Dusk's objections, but Demerzel kills Dawn anyway, affirming that her loyalty to the Cleon dynasty supersedes Day's wishes. Day is later informed that the anti-Empire conspiracy had altered Cleon I's DNA long ago, affecting all clones, including Day himself. Gaal lands on Synnax. At the ruins of her hometown, she finds another underwater pod and awakens Salvor, who tells her she is Gaal's daughter. Salvor gives Hari Seldon's Prime Radiant to Gaal.

=== Season 2 (2023) ===
| No. overall | No. in season | Title | Directed by | Written by | Original release date |
|---|---|---|---|---|---|
| 11 | 1 | "In Seldon's Shadow" | Alex Graves | David S. Goyer & Jane Espenson | July 14, 2023 |
A copy of Hari Seldon's consciousness within the Prime Radiant tries to find his way out with the help of what appears to be a manifestation of the radiant itself. On the ocean planet Synnax, Gaal and Salvor, after examining the Radiant and learning that Hari's plan is veering off course, work to reactivate Salvor's ship Beggar so they can return to Terminus. Brother Day (Cleon XVII) survives an assassination attempt by the Blind Angels while he is being intimate with Demerzel, and blames Brothers Dawn and Dusk for being complicit. He plans to wed Queen Sareth I of the Cloud Dominion to end the genetic dynasty and change the direction of the Empire, but she is not impressed with him and disparages his offer. Empire finds out that Terminus was not destroyed by a megaflare as they had presumed—the incident was concurrent with the discovery of the genetic dynasty's corruption, therefore was never fully probed—but decides to investigate further before acting. After escaping the Radiant, Hari confronts Gaal and Salvor inside the Beggar.
| 12 | 2 | "A Glimpse of Darkness" | David S. Goyer | Jane Espenson & David S. Goyer | July 21, 2023 |
Hari informs Salvor and Gaal that establishing a Second Foundation is crucial for the survival of the first and for his plan to work, but that was interrupted when Gaal fled the ship while en route to Helicon. Then, with Hari's help, they jump-start the Beggar and leave Synnax just in time before huge storm waves hit them. Over dinner, Queen Sareth discusses with Empire the particulars of their impending union while tactfully delving into the assassination attempt. On planet Siwenna, Poly Verisof, High Claric of the Foundation, and his junior, Novice Claric Brother Constant, while spreading the Foundation's mission, learn that Seldon's vault has reopened, and hastily jump back to Terminus to attend what will ensue. The Warden approaches Seldon's vault and is incinerated before the name "Hober Mallow" appears written on the vault. Gaal peers 150 years into the future and is attacked by a telepath called the Mule, who is the source of the impending darkness, just before she sees Salvor dead beside her. After the encounter, Gaal procures from her future self the location of the Second Foundation on the planet Ignis.
| 13 | 3 | "King and Commoner" | David S. Goyer | Leigh Dana Jackson & Jane Espenson | July 28, 2023 |
On behalf of Empire, Demerzel recruits Bel Riose, a former general now imprisoned in the Lepsis penal colony, to investigate the dissident Foundation. After Riose attends an audience with Empire, he is reunited with his husband, Glawen Curr, before leading a fleet to investigate the Outer Reach. Hari leads Gaal and Salvor to Oona's World, a desert and former mining planet. After persuading Gaal to carry him to a chamber up in the mountains, his consciousness is transferred into an organic body by Kalle, whose real identity remains elusive. Just when Gaal and Salvor are about to make their ascent from the desert planet, autonomous mining machines reactivate and start attacking the Beggar. They successfully evade the attacking machines and leave the planet after retrieving Hari's unconscious body. Hober Mallow, a con man and master trader, steals the Eye of Korell by switching places with Commdor Argo using a teleportation device. His plan is foiled, and he is captured and sentenced to death. He deceives his captors again, using the same technology, and escapes Korell in the ship that Poly and Constant had just arrived in to appeal for his release.
| 14 | 4 | "Where the Stars are Scattered Thinly" | Mark Tonderai | Leigh Dana Jackson & David S. Goyer | August 4, 2023 |
Sareth and Dawn walk the palace gardens while benignly questioning each other on the recent events of violence on their respective families, resulting in them confirming their mutual honesty. Dusk and Rue reminisce about their time together back when she was a concubine at Gossamer Court, and Dusk offers to show Rue recordings of their encounter, as her memories of the event were presumably wiped before leaving Trantor. Riose and Glawen infiltrate Siwenna to meet with the informant Ducem Barr, who reveals information about the 'Magicians', their advanced technology, and their connection to the Foundation, though Riose remains sceptical. They escape after a local mob, alerted by their presence, tries to break in. Barr poisons himself to prevent getting captured before Riose delivers a coup de grâce. Poly, Constant, and Hober arrive on Terminus, enter the Vault, and meet with Hari Seldon, who instructs the clarics to attempt peace talks with the Imperium to prevent a war, but gives Mallow a different set of instructions; Hober leaves in their ship with Constant's pet Beki onboard. Sareth employs the service of a palace claviger to discover the reasons behind her family's deaths.
| 15 | 5 | "The Sighted and the Seen" | Alex Graves | Joelle Garfinkel & Jane Espenson | August 11, 2023 |
Hari awakens aboard the Beggar, facing an apparition of Raych, which dissipates after a brief confrontation. Hari, Gaal, and Salvor discuss how his organic body came to be before the Beggar enters Ignis' atmosphere, where it is hit by negative ions and crash lands on the planet. Salvor leaves the ship to investigate a possible observer. On Trantor, Sareth accesses Cleon's bed chamber to learn more about the assassination attempt, but is discovered, which leads to her accepting Brother Day's marriage proposal. Dusk and Rue spend more time together. Concerned about memory audits, Dusk and Dawn visit the Memorium to inspect their memory hoards. While inspecting the memory audit of an Asclepieion caregiver, Sareth and Rue discover Demerzel's robotic nature. Salvor seemingly reunites with Hugo Crast on Ignis, to her elation and Hari's suspicion, but he is subsequently revealed to be a telepath, assaults the Beggar alongside other telepaths and captures Salvor, Hari, and Gaal. The trio is brought before the telepaths' leader, Tellem Bond, who reveals Ignis to be a refuge for Mentalics (telepaths), who is already aware of their plans for a Second Foundation.
| 16 | 6 | "Why the Gods Made Wine" | Alex Graves | Story by : David S. Goyer; Teleplay by : Jane Espenson | August 18, 2023 |
Salvor learns from a Mentalic's visions that Tellem has saved Mentalics from persecution and brought them to Ignis. After Tellem opposes establishing the Second Foundation on Ignis, Gaal shares the visions, but she refuses to accept the knowledge of an inescapable future. Tellem offers Gaal training and future leadership of the Mentalics, but forces her to choose between Hari and the Mentalics. Hari's distrust of Tellem grows. After a heated argument, Hari appears to leave the planet but is actually captured and restrained in a tidal pool, where Tellem plans on killing him. As he slowly drowns, Hari has visions of his childhood, his early research on Helicon, and his life partner, Yanna, who was carrying their child but died at the hands of the Empire. Brother Day introduces his bride-to-be to the people of Trantor, but Sareth upstages him, wins the crowd, and leaves him feeling unsettled. Hober Mallow arrives at the coordinates Hari had given him, finds the Spacer mothership and climbs onboard. Constant and Poly arrive on Trantor for the Foundation and are arrested.
| 17 | 7 | "A Necessary Death" | Mark Tonderai | Eric Carrasco & David Kob | August 25, 2023 |
After Queen Sareth undergoes a mandatory medical inspection, Demerzel insinuates her involvement in Sareth's family's murder. Sareth later confronts Brother Day and confirms his involvement. Hober Mallow approaches the Spacers with an offer to free them from the Empire by giving them the Opalesk, a synthesised micronutrient on which they are dependent. However, after weighing the risks, the Spacers reject Hober's offer and turn him over to General Riose. With the help of Beki, Hober escapes on his whisper-ship, while demonstrating Foundation's jump technology. General Riose, at the behest of his husband, considers defying Empire, but decides against it. Sareth proposes to Dawn that he impregnate her instead of Day, reflecting their growing connection. Constant and Poly are granted an audience with Empire. Constant unwittingly carries an interface of Hari Seldon, who confronts Empire and unnerves Brother Day, causing him to order a blockade around Terminus. On Ignis, Salvor remains suspicious of the Mentalics' motives and Hari's sudden departure, but her suggestion of leaving is rejected by Gaal. She continues to investigate and discovers the tide pool and Hari's drowned body. She is caught by Tellem, who renders Salvor unconscious.
| 18 | 8 | "The Last Empress" | Roxann Dawson | Liz Phang & Addie Manis & Bob Oltra | September 1, 2023 |
In Demerzel's quarters, Brother Dusk catches Rue, who reveals Dominion's memory restoration capabilities. This makes Dusk suspect her in the attempt on Day's life, which Rue denies. Later, Dusk and Rue notice an odd section on the Mural of Souls, but are interrupted by news of the execution. Just as the clerics are about to be killed, Hober Mallow's whisper-ship appears and causes an explosion, ensuing chaos. Hober manages to rescue Constant, though Poly is left behind. Brother Day is almost killed. Afterwards, despite Dusk and Demerzel's opposition, but with Sareth's support, Day decides to travel to Terminus. On Ignis, while being held captive, Salvor links with Hari Seldon in the Vault, and he aids her in escaping. Gaal is being held captive by Tellem, who is preparing to transfer her psyche into Gaal's body. Constant and Hober (inside the whisper-ship) and Sareth and Dawn (in the heat sinks on Trantor) consummate their respective relationships, while Dusk and Rue discover a passageway behind the mural that leads to a hidden chamber, where they are greeted by Cleon I's projection, offering to reveal details of Demerzel's origins.
| 19 | 9 | "Long Ago, Not Far Away" | Roxann Dawson | Jane Espenson & Eric Carrasco | September 8, 2023 |
610 years earlier, young Prince Cleon of the Entun Dynasty finds a hidden hallway in the palace and encounters a partitioned Demerzel. She entices the youngster with tales of the robot wars, and he continues to visit her over the years. An elderly Cleon finally frees her from 5,000 years of captivity, but installs programming that compels her to serve the Empire. In the present, Cleon I traps Brother Dusk and Rue in the same chamber. On Ignis, Tellem attempts to force her psyche into Gaal, but Salvor saves her, and they flee. On Terminus, Day meets Foundation leadership and proceeds to the Church of Seldon, which he angrily proclaims to be an armoury and orders the priests to be executed. Battle between the Imperial fleet and the Foundation ensues. After Seldon refuses to denounce psychohistory, Day orders the Invictus to be brought down on the planet. On Ignis, Salvor fights with Tellem's enforcer and manages to kill him. Tellem then subdues both Gaal and Salvor, but Hari, unexpectedly still alive, intervenes and kills Tellem. Demerzel leaves Day and returns to Trantor. Day grins while watching the singularity caused by the crashing Invictus destroy Terminus.
| 20 | 10 | "Creation Myths" | Alex Graves | David S. Goyer & Liz Phang | September 15, 2023 |
Brother Day orders the Imperial fleet to destroy Foundation's allied worlds. Riose refuses and is relieved of his command. Using a smuggled jump sequence, She-Bends-Light sets the entire Imperial fleet to collide. Day tries to throw Riose out of an airlock, but loses. Trapped on a doomed vessel, Hober ejects Constant into space in a cleaning module. On Trantor, Demerzel confronts Dusk and Rue. Realizing they are doomed, she reluctantly kills them. Dawn frees Sareth, who is pregnant, and they escape. With all three brothers gone, Demerzel decants new clones and activates her copy of the Prime Radiant. Near Terminus, Hari's vault pulls Constant's pod inside, finding that it is carrying the entire population of Terminus. On Ignis, Tellem's death has freed all Mentalics from her control. However, her psyche had escaped into Josiah, who attempts to assassinate Gaal. Salvor kills Josiah, but is killed. Salvor's death shows Gaal and Hari that the future is not set. They agree to enter cryo-sleep, waking each year to teach and guide the Second Foundation and prepare them for future battle. 152 years in the future, a crazed Mule becomes aware of Gaal's presence.

=== Season 3 (2025) ===
| No. overall | No. in season | Title | Directed by | Written by | Original release date |
|---|---|---|---|---|---|
| 21 | 1 | "A Song for the End of Everything" | David S. Goyer | David S. Goyer & Jane Espenson | July 11, 2025 |
152 years after the Second Crisis, the Empire has given up control of the Outer Reach, and the Foundation has amassed over 800 planets. The Mule, a powerful Mentalic, uses mind control to seize control of the independent planet Kalgan. Brother Dawn (Cleon XXV) and Demerzel meet with the Galactic Council with a plan to undermine the Foundation by covertly providing weapons to the Traders, a disgruntled faction of merchants within the Foundation. With ten days left before Dawn's Ascension to Day, Dusk (Cleon XXIII) contemplates his impending immolation, and Day (Cleon XXIV) continues ignoring his duties in favor of a hedonistic lifestyle. A new timeline appears within the Prime Radiant, which Demerzel realizes will unavoidably cause Seldon's psychohistory models to fail in four months. Foundation's Captain of Information, Han Pritcher, and his partner Sephone attempt to collect evidence that the Empire is assisting the Traders. They fail, but Pritcher is convinced that the Mule, and not the Traders, is the real threat to the Foundation. Mayor Indbur of New Terminus rejects his plan to investigate the Mule. Pritcher steals Indbur's ship and heads to Kalgan anyway. Gaal wakes from cryo-sleep, knowing that a confrontation with the Mule is imminent.
| 22 | 2 | "Shadows in the Math" | Tim Southam | Leigh Dana Jackson & Caitlin Parrish | July 18, 2025 |
On Ignis, Hari and Gaal awake from their cryo-sleep. Realizing their task to train the Mentalics in time for the Third Crisis is large, Hari remains awake whilst Gaal returns to sleep. When she next awakens, Preem Palver is the leader of the Second Foundation and an elderly Hari disappears with Kalle, the mysterious woman who gave him physical form. On Trantor, Brother Dusk campaigns, first with Demerzel and then with Day, for his forthcoming immolation to be delayed due to the imminent threats facing the Empire. Brother Day continues his nihilistic lifestyle and refuses to attend Brother Dawn's Ascension. Dawn and Dusk meet with the Foundation ambassador. On Kalgan, newly-wed social influencers Toran and Bayta Mallow enjoy a holiday from a mountaintop villa, while the Mule continues to demonstrate his extraordinary powers of persuasion to the military class. In secret, Dusk inspects a new secret mega-weapon. Dawn has his own secret – a discussion with Gaal, to discuss the coming threat of the Mule.
| 23 | 3 | "When a Book Finds You" | Tim Southam | Eric Carrasco & Greg Goetz | July 25, 2025 |
The origins of Dawn's interest in psychohistory are revealed with his first meeting years ago with a projection of Gaal Dornick. In the present, Gaal requests that Dawn 'enclose' Kalgan to stymie the Mule's ascent. Pritcher uses Toran and Bayta as a way into a lavish party given by the Mule, but leaves when he is psychically overcome. After Toran angers the Mule at the party, he and Bayta escape with Magnifico Giganticus, a mistreated balladeer within the Mule's entourage. The Mule begins reprisals to punish those who did not prevent the escape, confessing he doesn't feel in control of himself before murdering a soldier. On Trantor, fearing the imminent end of history, Day seeks the Imperial Garrison's help to leave Trantor covertly. Thwarted from stronger action against Kalgan by his brothers, Dawn is only able to order continued surveillance. Demerzel removes Day's companion Song and her memories after he reveals to her Demerzel's true robotic nature.
| 24 | 4 | "The Stress of Her Regard" | Roxann Dawson | Jane Espenson & David Kob | August 1, 2025 |
Demerzel confesses to Zephyr Vorellis that, three centuries earlier, she orchestrated the attacks on the Star Bridge, framing Thespis and Anacreon to prevent Seldon's execution, because she felt the Foundation was best suited to extend Empire. Pritcher meets Gaal on Ignis. Preem Palver helps Pritcher to see that the Mule "read" him, but whilst the latter is now aware of Gaal and the Second Foundation, he does not know their location. Gaal urges Pritcher to convince the First Foundation to support war with the Mule, ahead of the third Seldon Crisis, just 72 hours away. Ebling Mis talks to New Terminus Mayor Indbur and Ambassador Quent about his discussions with Hari Seldon, and reveals that the original Prime Radiant is held by the Cleon dynasty. Quent and Dusk explore the Prime Radiant. Day seeks information from Cleon I about his role in suppressing the Robot-worshipping Inheritance cult in Mycogen in the year 26. Demerzel tells Day about the connection between robots. Dawn meets with Gaal in person, but is followed, and they escape together on Gaal's ship. Fulfilling his plans with the Claviger, Day escapes the Imperial palace and removes his nanites, but kills the Claviger for being disloyal.
| 25 | 5 | "Where Tyrants Spend Eternity" | Christopher J. Byrne | Caitlin Parrish & Leigh Dana Jackson | August 8, 2025 |
Day disappears into Mycogen. Demerzel investigates Claviger Mavon's body, deducing Day's escape. On New Terminus, Captain Pritcher is berated by Mayor Indbur for his meeting with the Mule and is imprisoned. The Mallows' ship, damaged by the Mule's fire, returns to the planet Haven, where it crashes after being targeted by planetary defenses. Gaal and Dawn travel to Clarion Station, where Dawn blackmails the local leader, Vynod Tarisk, to sway votes for the Imperial enclosure of Kalgan. Mallow and his party are rescued by his uncle Randu. Bayta and Randu discuss the effects of Magnifico's music and the role this could play in allowing the Trader faction to control the Foundation. The Imperial armada encloses Kalgan, but the Mule has already left, and he utilises Kalgan's star's energy to destroy the planet and the Armada. Dawn forces Gaal to admit that he was set up for the enclosure to fail, to bring the Empire's age to a close, in an attempt to return to psychohistory's intended timeline. Dawn sends a message to Dusk before he is attacked by a vengeful Tarisk and sucked out of an airlock into space. Demerzel boards Gaal's ship.
| 26 | 6 | "The Shape of Time" | Christopher J. Byrne | Eric Carrasco & David S. Goyer | August 15, 2025 |
The Mule states he has been tormented by what he now knows to be Gaal's face, and he must destroy her. Demerzel tells Gaal that Dawn has died. After a physical confrontation, Gaal tells Demerzel of the Second Foundation and her mentalic abilities, and her need to protect it from the Mule. Demerzel investigates Gaal's vision, revealing it to take place in the Imperial Library, and discovers that it incorporates the infrasonic signature of a black hole. Day explores an exotic marketplace in Mycogen and meets with Song, offering to restore deleted memories of their time together, but she refuses and insists that she wants nothing further to do with him. The ship carrying the Mallows and Magnifico arrives at New Terminus, where they are detained with Pritcher. Magnifico is allowed to play his visi-sonar instrument, unifying competing Foundation interests. An eclipse occurs, and the Vault opens as Foundation leaders gather there. Seldon appears and alludes to the Foundation's internal divisions and a merchant class; however, to their dismay, psychohistory did not predict the rise of the Mule, and Hari knows nothing of him. A hologram of the Mule appears and shows a battle in the skies above, as his forces attack New Terminus. Seldon withdraws and the Vault closes, while its visitors deal with the perils of the null field and aerial bombardment. Demerzel predicts that the Mule will capture the Foundation's whisper ships and put Trantor in peril.
| 27 | 7 | "Foundation's End" | Christopher J. Byrne | Jane Espenson & Greg Goetz | August 22, 2025 |
In flashbacks, a farmer's family on Rossem protects their infant child from the Foundation's assessors, who enforce calorific limits on its citizens; attempting to drown their older child to save the baby, the child's mental powers manifest and he ruthlessly kills them. In the present, New Terminus is torn apart by the Mule's forces, while Foundation ships attack each other as a result of the Mule's psychic influence. The Mule lands, victorious, and is met by Mayor Indbur's surrender. In Mycogen, under the effect of hallucinogens administered by Song, Day reveals his early interactions with Demerzel, who revealed she has had many past lives and names, including Eto and Daneel. Sunmaster-18, a spiritual leader, meets the captive Day. Dusk protects Quent, the Foundation ambassador and an old friend. Pritcher escapes from custody. Escaping in their ship, the Mallows are confronted by Randu, now a Mule convert; Toran escapes, while Bayta is captured and Randu is killed. Indbur drowns himself on the Mule's orders. At the Vault, Hari Seldon finally meets the Mule.
| 28 | 8 | "Skin in the Game" | Roxann Dawson | Caitlin Parrish & Tyler Holmes | August 29, 2025 |
The Mule seeks information about Gaal's location from Seldon at the Vault, but Hari uses the null field to demonstrate his powers and repel him. In the Mycogen sector, Day is tried by Sunmaster-18 in the Sacratorium; the trial includes performance art that recalls the role of robots in the Inheritance Sect, and Day learns that Daneel is their savior. Day is able to unwittingly initiate a digital handshake with a robot relic, while Sunmaster-18 sentences Day to death. Demerzel returns to Trantor, informing Dusk that Dawn is dead. With only two days until his demise, Dusk is met by a delegation from the Galactic Council, the Luminists, and the Cloud Dominion, who inform the outraged Dusk that they plan to give Trantor to the Mule, to preserve a more sustainable yet smaller Empire. Dusk attempts to talk Demerzel out of decanting new Cleons and tells her of his superweapon, the Novacula. Demerzel renounces her Luminist faith to Vorellis. Dawn wakes up in a hospital facility orbiting New Terminus, being treated for horrific injuries, alongside Bayta. The Mule visits, seeking information about Gaal. On Ignis, Gaal tells Palver that they must evacuate the Second Foundation because the Mule will use Han to find them. Gaal and a crew travel to New Terminus to confront the Mule.
| 29 | 9 | "The Paths That Choose Us" | Roxann Dawson | Jane Espenson & Eric Carrasco | September 5, 2025 |
Gaal and her followers capture New Terminus' warden, but the warden dies while Gaal probes her mind. Through scattered street fighting, Gaal, joined by Pritcher, is led to a hiding place where they find Toran, Ebling and Magnifico, who is still in thrall to the Mule. Day plummets into the catacombs beneath the Mycogen sector, but is freed by Song; Day escapes and kills Sunmaster-18 to obtain the robot head. During a conference with the Mule, Demerzel, Ambassador Quent and the three off-world representatives, Dusk withdraws the offer of Trantor and unleashes his Novacula weapon, destroying the homeworld of the Galactic Council, the minor planets of Cloud Dominion, and the Luminist faith's holy world, the Maiden. The Mule surmises that the Novacula cannot reach New Terminus. Demerzel reveals her uncertainty and distress to Dusk, while Quent confronts Dusk about the billions murdered by his weapon. Demerzel examines Kalle's Ninth Proof of Folding, enters the Prime Radiant, and meets Kalle herself, who tells her that Trantor's Library was a haven for survivors of the Robot Wars. Gaal and her followers visit the Vault Seldon. Hari agrees to help her reach the Mule, under condition that he is to be taken to the other Seldon, unaware the latter is already dead. He also gives her a vague warning about the Mule.
| 30 | 10 | "The Darkness" | Roxann Dawson | Jane Espenson & David S. Goyer | September 12, 2025 |
Day returns to the palace and presents Demerzel with the robot head from the Inheritance cult. On New Terminus, Gaal and her forces attack the Mule, using the Vault to travel to the orbital station. As Seldon provides a distraction, Gaal confronts the Mule that she knows, a mental battle that leaves him dead from her blade. She soon realizes that he was only a cypher; the real Mule is still alive and is actually Bayta Mallow. Controlled by Bayta, Pritcher shoots Gaal and prepares her for conversion, but Bayta is instead overwhelmed by the music from Magnifico's visi-sonar, allowing Gaal to re-board her ship and escape the station. Vault Seldon realizes Gaal has lied to him in promising him a physical body. On Trantor, a now deranged Dusk destroys the successor chamber, preserving only a single baby, which later dies along with Demerzel, who is programmed to try to save the child by any means necessary. Now in possession of the Prime Radiant and free of Demerzel's influence, Dusk murders Day, believing Seldon's prophesied fall of Empire meant his rise to lead the Empire himself as Brother Darkness. Acting on Demerzel's final instruction, Quent presents Kalle's book to the librarian Nee Tellamarus, who along with Palver welcomes her into the Second Foundation, now in hiding on Trantor itself. The robot head recovered from Mycogen activates and sends a clasping signal to another part of the galaxy, which is received by Kalle, revealed to be in hiding with other robots on the Moon orbiting the Earth.

=== Season 4 ===
| No. overall | No. in season | Title | Directed by | Written by | Original release date |
|---|---|---|---|---|---|
| 31 | 1 | TBA | TBA | Ian Goldberg | TBA |
| 32 | 2 | TBA | TBA | Natalie Chaidez & Richard Naing | TBA |
| 33 | 3 | TBA | TBA | Corey Reed & David Kob | TBA |
| 34 | 4 | TBA | TBA | TBA | TBA |
| 35 | 5 | TBA | TBA | Ian Goldberg & David Kob | TBA |
| 36 | 6 | TBA | TBA | Ian Goldberg & David Kob | TBA |
| 37 | 7 | TBA | TBA | Ian Goldberg & David Kob | TBA |
| 38 | 8 | TBA | TBA | Ian Goldberg & Drew Allyn | TBA |
| 39 | 9 | TBA | TBA | David Kob | TBA |
| 40 | 10 | TBA | TBA | Ian Goldberg & David Kob | TBA |

== Production ==
=== Development ===
On June 27, 2017, it was reported that Skydance Television was developing a television series adaptation of Isaac Asimov's science fiction book series Foundation with David S. Goyer and Josh Friedman serving as the production's writers. At the time of the report, the production company was in the midst of closing a deal with Asimov's estate for the rights to the book series. On April 10, 2018, Apple, through their Worldwide Video Unit, bought the series and put it into development with the potential for a straight-to-series order. Goyer and Friedman were also expected to serve as executive producers and showrunners. Other executive producers included David Ellison, Dana Goldberg, and Marcy Ross.

On August 23, 2018, Apple ordered the production of a first season consisting of ten episodes, with Asimov's daughter, Robyn Asimov, serving as an executive producer. On April 18, 2019, Josh Friedman left as co-writer and co-showrunner. Troy Studios in Limerick, Ireland, hosted production of the show. According to Screen Ireland the series would create more than 500 production jobs at the studio. Asimov's daughter, Robyn Asimov, provides familial assistance to the series. Goyer pitched the series in one sentence: "It's a 1,000-year chess game between Hari Seldon and the Empire, and all the characters in between are the pawns, but some of the pawns over the course of this saga end up becoming kings and queens."

In October 2021, Apple TV+ renewed the series for a second season In December 2023, the series was renewed for a third season, In September 2025, Apple TV+ renewed the series for a fourth season with Ian B. Goldberg and David Kob replacing Goyer as showrunners, though Goyer is still involved as part of the executive production team.

=== Writing ===
In January 2021, Goyer stated "with Foundation we can tell the story, hopefully, over the course of eighty episodes; eighty hours, as opposed to trying to condense it all into two or three hours for a single film". Goyer said that this format might not succeed, but if it did it would be unique. David S. Goyer and Josh Friedman were set as the production's writers. Friedman left as co-writer in April 2019. Goyer also noted that telling a story that took place over 1,000 years was something a film could not accomplish and would have been a harder story to tell in that format.

=== Casting ===
Lee Pace and Jared Harris play Brother Day and Hari Seldon, respectively. Lou Llobell stars as Gaal Dornick, a mathematical genius from a rural, repressed aquatic planet. Leah Harvey plays Salvor Hardin, the protective and intuitive warden of a remote outer planet. Laura Birn stars as Demerzel, the enigmatic gynoid aide to the Emperor of the Galaxy. Terrence Mann stars as Brother Dusk, the eldest living member of the ruling family. Cassian Bilton plays Brother Dawn, the youngest living member of the ruling family and next in line to be Brother Day. New characters Brother Day, Brother Dusk, and Brother Dawn are original characters created for the series. Each is a different-aged clone in the "genetic dynasty" of the Emperor Cleon I: the youngest clone is called Dawn, the middle clone and reigning emperor is called Day, and the emperor emeritus is called Dusk. In a June 2021 trailer, Alfred Enoch joined the cast.

For season two, Isabella Laughland was cast as Brother Constant, along with Sandra Yi Sencindiver, Ella-Rae Smith, Dimitri Leonidas, Ben Daniels, Holt McCallany, Mikael Persbrandt, Rachel House, and Nimrat Kaur. For season three, Alexander Siddig and Troy Kotsur were cast in the roles of Dr. Ebling Mis, a self-taught psychohistorian, and Preem Palver, the leader of a planet of psychics, respectively. Siddig previously appeared in a season one guest role as a different character. Additional season three series regulars include Pilou Asbæk (a recast of the Mule), Cherry Jones, Synnøve Karlsen, Cody Fern, Brandon P. Bell, Tómas Lemarquis, Yootha Wong-Loi-Sing and Leo Bill.

=== Filming ===
On March 12, 2020, Apple suspended production of the show in Ireland due to the COVID-19 pandemic. On October 6, filming was resumed. On January 27, 2021, after quarantining and receiving special waivers from the government of Malta, cast and crew members were allowed to start filming on the island. Goyer noted some filming was always planned to be conducted in Malta. Due to new restrictions imposed in London, they moved significant portions of production to Malta. Filming in Malta concluded in February 2021. Filming in Tuineje, Fuerteventura (Canary Islands) was already wrapped by March 2021. The production team worked in volcanic landscapes such as the Caldera de los Arrabales and Granja de Pozo Negro. The production team then moved to Tenerife, where filming resumed on March 22, 2021. Filming concluded in April 2021 after 19 months.

The second season began filming in Prague, Czech Republic, on April 11, 2022.

The third season began filming in late May 2023 in Prague. Filming was halted on July 14, 2023, due to the 2023 Hollywood labor disputes. Production on the third season was expected to resume in Prague in February 2024, but was disbanded once again due to budgetary issues. Production resumed in March 2024 in Prague and Poland.

The fourth season began filming in January 2026 in Prague, and was expected to wrap in July 2026.

== Reception ==
=== Season 1 ===
Critical response of Foundation
| Season | Rotten Tomatoes | Metacritic |
|---|---|---|
| 1 | 72% (89 reviews) | 62 (25 reviews) |
| 2 | 100% (26 reviews) | 79 (6 reviews) |
| 3 | 91% (23 reviews) | 83 (9 reviews) |

The first season received some positive reviews, with praise aimed towards its performances (Pace and Harris in particular), epic scale, visual effects, and score by Bear McCreary. The pacing, specifically of the time jumps, use of narration, and complexity of plot were often criticized.

The review aggregator website Rotten Tomatoes reports a 72% approval rating based on 89 reviews for the first season. The website's critical consensus reads, "Foundation's big-budget production and impressive performances are a sight to behold, but it struggles to wrangle the behemoth that is its source material into a fully satisfying series." Metacritic gave the first season a weighted average score of 62 out of 100 based on 25 reviews, indicating "generally favorable reviews".

Nick Allen of RogerEbert.com considers Foundation to be "the type of sci-fi series that truly warrants being called an event", a "grandiose sci-fi with limits". He writes that the show is "huge in numerous senses", praising its world building as "always impressive with its grandeur that's both practical and also created with IMAX-worthy special effects". He also praised Bear McCreary's score as "essential and so effective in making certain story developments seem larger than life". Allen highlighted Lee Pace's performance as "magnetic". He concludes that the show has a potential to "become another landmark series for Apple TV+", and that its best feature actually is that "it's not for everyone" because "it's fairly set in its pacing that favors heady, dense character building" that will favor subscribers "hungry to enter new sci-fi worlds not just for the action".

Film reviewer Rob Bricken of Gizmodo was less impressed with the series, suggesting that it could be much better, and stating "Honestly, after most of the second episode, the show and the books are pretty much unrecognizable", as well as that the original source material of Foundation may not be filmable after all. Judy Berman of Time called the series "gorgeous, expensive, potential-packed but initially quite confusing" and noted "how beautiful every single frame is."

The Verge's Chaim Gartenberg and Andrew Webster weighed in at the end of Season 1, with Gartenberg opining "the 'genetic dynasty' of a succession of Lee Pace's ruling the crumbling empire with an iron fist is the show's highlight, thanks in no small part to Pace's dynamic performances as the cloned Brother Day. And Salvor Hardin's cat-and-mouse game on Terminus with the Anacreons is enjoyable sci-fi fare, too. Meanwhile, the third leg of the story, the prolonged drama of Gaal's shuttling in cryo from place to place as the show hints at her mysterious powers, is... less compelling" and Webster stating that "once all of the initial worldbuilding and discussion of future-predicting math was out of the way in the first few episodes, Foundation really picked up in a lot of ways. The worldbuilding remains incredible throughout. All of the many cultures and planets have a depth to them that is quite frankly astounding."

=== Season 2 ===
The second season received more positive reviews from critics, with many agreeing that it was an improvement over its first season, emphasizing the more accessible pacing, better plot, improved interpersonal characterizations, and overall satisfaction with the season's payoff.

On Rotten Tomatoes, the second season has a 100% approval rating based on 26 reviews. The website's critical consensus reads, "With its complicated bedrock now established, Foundation spreads its wings in an improved sophomore season that rewards viewers' patience with a brainy sci-fi epic of genuine grandeur." On Metacritic, it has a weighted score of 79 out of 100 based on 6 reviews, indicating "generally favorable reviews".

=== Season 3 ===
On Rotten Tomatoes, the third season has a 91% approval rating based on 22 reviews. The website's critical consensus reads, "Foundation's narratively knotty third season doesn't quite measure up to its superb predecessor, but this sci-fi epic endures as a faithful and well-acted adaptation of Isaac Asimov's masterpiece." On Metacritic, it has a weighted score of 83 out of 100 based on 8 reviews, indicating "universal acclaim".

=== Accolades ===
| Award | Date of ceremony | Category | Recipient(s) | Result | Ref. |
|---|---|---|---|---|---|
| Art Directors Guild Awards | March 5, 2022 | Excellence in Production Design for a One-Hour Period or Fantasy Single-Camera Series | Rory Cheyne (for "The Emperor's Peace") | Nominated | |
| Visual Effects Society Awards | March 8, 2022 | Outstanding Visual Effects in a Photoreal Episode | Chris MacLean, Addie Manis, Mike Enriquez, Chris Keller, Paul Byrne (for "The Emperor's Peace") | Won | |
| Visual Effects Society Awards | March 8, 2022 | Outstanding Created Environment in an Episode, Commercial, or Real-Time Project | Samuel Simanjuntak, Melaina Mace, Benjamin Ruiz, Alessandro Vastalegna (for "Trantor Cityscape") | Nominated | |
| Visual Effects Society Awards | March 8, 2022 | Outstanding Effects Simulations in an Episode, Commercial, or Real-Time Project | Giovanni Casadei, Mikel Zuloaga, Steven Moor, Louis Manjarres (for "Collapse of the Galactic Empire") | Won | |
| Visual Effects Society Awards | February 25, 2026 | Outstanding Environment in an Episodic, Commercial, Game Cinematic or Real-Time Project | Sylvain Lesaint, Ilyes Boutemeur, Blake Dewoody, Benjamin Rojek (for "A Song for the End of Everything; Clarion Station") | Nominated | |
| Golden Reel Awards | March 13, 2022 | Outstanding Achievement in Sound Editing – Series 1 Hour – Comedy or Drama – Dialogue and ADR | Tyler Whitham, Paul Germann, Dave Rose, Steve Baine (for "The Emperor's Peace") | Nominated | |
| Critics' Choice Super Awards | March 17, 2022 | Best Science Fiction/Fantasy Series | Foundation | Nominated | |
| Critics' Choice Super Awards | March 17, 2022 | Best Actor in a Science Fiction/Fantasy Series | Jared Harris | Nominated | |
| Critics' Choice Super Awards | March 17, 2022 | Best Actor in a Science Fiction/Fantasy Series | Lee Pace | Nominated | |
| American Society of Cinematographers Awards | March 20, 2022 | Outstanding Achievement in Cinematography in Motion Picture, Limited Series, or Pilot Made for Television | Stevie Annis (for "The Emperor's Peace") | Nominated | |
| Primetime Creative Arts Emmy Awards | September 3–4, 2022 | Outstanding Main Title Design | Ronnie Koff, Zach Kilroy, Danil Krivoruchko, James Gardner, Brandon Savoy | Nominated | |
| Primetime Creative Arts Emmy Awards | September 3–4, 2022 | Outstanding Special Visual Effects in a Season or a Movie | Chris MacLean, Addie Manis, Mike Enriquez, Victoria Keeling, Chris Keller, Jess Brown, Nicholas Hernandez, Richard Clegg | Nominated | |

== Release ==
On June 22, 2020, as part of its Worldwide Developers Conference, Apple released a teaser trailer for the series. In February 2021, it was reported that the series would premiere in late 2021. In June 2021, Apple announced that Foundation would premiere in September 2021. Later that month, Apple released a second official trailer and confirmed the premiere date as September 24, 2021. The series premiered with a two-episode release, with the remaining eight episodes scheduled to be released weekly.

The second season premiered on July 14, 2023. The third season premiered on July 11, 2025.

== Media ==
A mobile game based on the series titled, Foundation: Galactic Frontier, was developed by FunPlus and Skydance Interactive. It globally launched on October 21, 2025 for iOS, Android, and PC.
