= Walter Hamada =

American film producer and executive

- Occupations: Film executive and producer
- Employer: Paramount Pictures
- Spouse: Michelle Hamada

Walter Hamada is an American film executive and producer. He joined New Line Cinema in 2007, where he served as an executive producer on horror films such as The Conjuring (2013), Annabelle (2014), The Conjuring 2 (2016), Lights Out (2016), and It (2017). In January 2018, he was appointed the President at Warner Bros. Pictures for DC-based film production (DC Films) before departing from the company in October 2022. He was hired by Paramount Pictures to oversee their horror films beginning in 2023.

== Career ==
Hamada began his career as an assistant at TriStar Pictures and became Vice President of production at Columbia Pictures, overseeing films such as The Big Hit, Godzilla and S.W.A.T. He also oversaw development for MBST Entertainment. Hamada worked for four years as a partner at the management and production company H2F Entertainment before leaving in 2007 to join New Line Cinema, a division of Warner Bros., where he served as a production executive for a decade. He oversaw their horror slate of films with Dave Neustadter, including The Conjuring series and It (2017). He also co-wrote the story for 47 Ronin (2013), a Universal Pictures film starring Keanu Reeves.

In January 2018, after Justice League underperformed critically and commercially, Warner Bros. appointed Hamada as the President for DC-based film production (DC Films) at Warner Bros. Pictures. In this capacity he oversaw production of the DC Extended Universe (DCEU) and other DC-based films. According to The Hollywood Reporter, his overseeing of the DC film Shazam! (2019) at New Line impressed Toby Emmerich, the then-President and chief content officer of Warner Bros. Pictures. In January 2021, he signed an extension to his contract with DC Films until 2023.

Former DCEU cast member Ray Fisher has accused Hamada of "undermining an investigation into misconduct that is alleged to have occurred during Joss Whedon's reshoots of Justice League", a claim that Warner Bros. and Katherine B. Forrest, the person in charge of the investigation, disputed.

When the release of the film Batgirl was cancelled by Warner Bros. Discovery, Hamada was reportedly not consulted regarding the decision and only learned about it when Warner Bros. Pictures Group co-chairpersons and CEOs Michael De Luca and Pamela Abdy informed him at a test screening for Black Adam. Hamada was upset and considered resigning, but agreed to stay until the release of Black Adam. He stepped down on October 19, 2022, two days before its release.

On November 15, 2022, Paramount Pictures announced that they had signed a multi-year production deal with Hamada to oversee their mainstream horror movies. The contract became effective on January 1, 2023. Hamada later launched his own production label named 18Hz Productions based at the Paramount Pictures studio lot. In April 2024, Paramount announced that Hamada will produce the film Teenage Mutant Ninja Turtles: The Last Ronin, an adaptation of the comic miniseries The Last Ronin, through 18Hz Productions. The film was later reported to be halted in favor of a live-action reboot.

== Filmography ==
Producer

- Sorority Boys (2002)
- Whisper (2007)
- Primate (2025)
- Passenger (2026)

Executive producer

- Friday the 13th (2009)
- The Final Destination (2009)
- A Nightmare on Elm Street (2010)
- Final Destination 5 (2011)
- The Incredible Burt Wonderstone (2013)
- The Conjuring (2013)
- 47 Ronin (2013) (Also story writer)
- Into the Storm (2014)
- Annabelle (2014)
- The Gallows (2015)
- The Conjuring 2 (2016)
- Lights Out (2016)
- Within (2016)
- Wolves at the Door (2016)
- Annabelle: Creation (2017)
- It (2017)
- Tag (2018)
- The Nun (2018)
- Aquaman (2018)
- The Curse of La Llorona (2019)
- Shazam! (2019)
- Joker (2019)
- Birds of Prey (2020)
- Wonder Woman 1984 (2020)
- The Suicide Squad (2021)
- The Batman (2022)
- Black Adam (2022)
- Shazam! Fury of the Gods (2023)
- The Flash (2023)
- Blue Beetle (2023)
- Aquaman and the Lost Kingdom (2023)
- Batgirl (unreleased)

== See also ==
- List of films based on DC Comics publications
