= Tuesday (2023 film) =

2023 film by Daina O. Pusić

- Theatrical release poster
- Directed by: Daina O. Pusić
- Written by: Daina O. Pusić
- Produced by: Helen Gladders; Ivana MacKinnon; Oliver Roskill
- Starring: Julia Louis-Dreyfus; Lola Petticrew; Leah Harvey; Arinzé Kene
- Cinematography: Alexis Zabé
- Edited by: Arttu Salmi
- Music by: Anna Meredith
- Production companies: Wild Swim Films; Gingerbread Pictures; Record Player Films
- Distributed by: A24
- Release dates: 1 September 2023 (Telluride); 7 June 2024 (United States); 9 August 2024 (United Kingdom)
- Running time: 110 minutes
- Countries: United States; United Kingdom
- Language: English
- Box office: $755,700

Tuesday is a 2023 fantasy drama film written and directed by Daina O. Pusić in her feature directorial debut. A co-production between the United Kingdom and the United States, the film stars Julia Louis-Dreyfus and Lola Petticrew as a mother and daughter who are guided by Death in the form of a size-altering macaw in coping with the daughter's impending death from a terminal illness. Leah Harvey and Arinzé Kene also star.

Tuesday had its world premiere at the 50th Telluride Film Festival on 1 September 2023. The film was released in North America in June 2024, and in the United Kingdom on 9 August 2024. It received generally favourable reviews from critics.

== Plot ==
Zora's 15-year-old wheelchair-using daughter Tuesday has an incurable terminal illness and Death comes to her in the form of a size-altering macaw to give her final deliverance from pain and suffering. Tuesday realises who and what the talking size-shifting bird is, and asks it not to kill her until her mother arrives home. Zora, on seeing Death and hearing it say that she needs to say good-bye to her daughter because every life must come to an end, at first tries to catch the macaw, and then tricks Death into going into the garden, where she bashes it repeatedly with a heavy book and sets fire to it. On hearing Death's dogged exhortation that Tuesday must die, Zora puts the badly charred bird into her mouth, chews and eats it.

With Death eaten in Zora's body and unable to perform its life-terminating duties, numerous reports begin to circulate of people and animals not dying from accidents, usually expected to be lethal, and then continuing to roam the countryside in zombie state despite their injuries. With Death still inside Zora, her size spontaneously changes when she is put under stress by Tuesday's persistent questioning about Death's whereabouts. Tuesday persuades her mother to deputise for Death in its absence, rendering final relief from pain to the suffering animals and people. On hearing Tuesday trying to control her pain through conscious breathing, Zora realises how much pain her daughter is in. She regurgitates Death and they come to an agreement how to proceed, with Tuesday dying later that day.

Zora becomes demoralised after her daughter's demise and sometime later Death comes to visit her to see how she is. Zora speculates that it would be better for her to be dead. But Death tells Zora that if she needs a reason to keep living, then it should be to keep Tuesday’s memory alive. The film closes with Zora exhaling and telling herself, "Get up, woman".

== Cast ==
- Julia Louis-Dreyfus as Zora
- Lola Petticrew as Tuesday
- Arinzé Kene as the voice of Death
- Leah Harvey as Nurse Billie
- Ellie James as Willow
- Taru Devani as Ira
- Jay Simpson as Spike
- David Sibley as Robert
- Nathan Amzi as Nathan
- Justin Edwards as Jack
- Hugh Futcher as Hans
- Nathan Ives-Moiba as Victor
- Ewens Abid as Abel
- Bijal Raj as Berrak
- Florencia Nunez as young Tuesday

== Production ==
In May 2021, it was announced that the Croatian director Daina Oniunas-Pusić would direct the film in her feature directorial debut, and that Julia Louis-Dreyfus, Lola Petticrew, Arinzé Kene and Leah Harvey had joined the cast.

Tuesday was co-produced between London-based Wild Swim Films and Gingerbread Pictures (which was founded by Helen Gladders, who served as one of the producers for the film), in association with Record Player Films (founded by Oliver Roskill, another one of this film's producers). Support and funding were provided by BBC Film, Creative England, BFI and US-based Cinereach (and with some additional funding originating from UK Government, according to the film's closing credits, namely HM Treasury and DCMS Film & TV Production Restart Scheme); with A24, BBC Film and BFI presenting the production.

Principal photography began in the United Kingdom in June 2021, with Alexis Zabé serving as cinematographer; filming wrapped in late July.

== Release ==
Tuesday had its world premiere at the 50th Telluride Film Festival on 1 September 2023. It was also screened at the BFI London Film Festival on 11 October 2023.

The film had a limited theatrical release in the United States on 7 June 2024, before expanding nationwide and to Canada on 14 June 2024. It was released in select cinemas in the United Kingdom on 9 August 2024.

== Reception ==
=== Box office ===
In the UK, Tuesday grossed $5,025 from 14 cinemas during its opening weekend.
In the USA, the film grossed $25,665 during its opening weekend from 2 theatres. As of August 2024, its revenue in North America was $706,683.

=== Critical response ===
On the review aggregator website Rotten Tomatoes, 76% of 111 critics' reviews are positive, with an average rating of 7.0/10. The website's consensus reads: "A meditation on mortality full of risky stylistic gambits, Tuesday achieves real grace thanks to Julia Louis-Dreyfus' committed performance and director Daina Oninuas-Pusic's impressive ambition." Metacritic, which uses a weighted average, assigned the film a score of 69 out of 100, based on 33 critics, indicating "generally favorable" reviews.

James Verniere of Boston Herald summarised in his positive review for Boston Movie News: "This striking debut film is like a live-action Studio Ghibli fable. Louis-Dreyfus is a revelation." JD Duran of InSession Film was equally upbeat: "Tuesday is a deeply weird, but funny movie about not just confronting death but creating a relationship with it."

Siddhant Adlakha gave the film a negative review on Mashable: "A confoundingly bad work of cinema. Has all the makings of a gentle fairytale about loss, but it ends up visually, narratively, and tonally janky at every possible turn." Peter Bradshaw of The Guardian echoed those sentiments: "As it is, the movie can’t quite bear to make the macaw properly funny, or properly scary. So the action exists in a tonal muddle."

NPR included Tuesday on its list of the best movies and TV of 2024, with critic Aisha Harris writing that "Daina O. Pusić’s impressive directorial debut is a big swing that connects on every level, if you allow it to."
