= Leah Harvey =

British actor (born c. 1993)

- Born: 1993/1994 (age 31–32); London, England
- Education: London Academy of Music and Dramatic Art
- Occupation: Actor
- Known for: Foundation

Leah Harvey (born 1993/1994) is a British actor. They are known for their role as Salvor Hardin in the series Foundation, which earned Harvey a BAFTA nomination.

== Early life and education ==
Harvey grew up in Upton Park, East London. As a child, they trained in karate and dancing.

Harvey attended the Brampton Manor Academy while taking dance and drama classes at the Deborah Day Theatre School Trust on a scholarship. They went on to graduate with a Bachelor of Arts from the London Academy of Music and Dramatic Art in 2016.

== Career ==
In addition to their starring role in the 2021 Apple TV+ series Foundation, Harvey's screen credits include the 2019 miniseries Les Misérables and the 2023 A24 film Tuesday. They appear in the Paramount+ and Showtime TV series A Gentleman in Moscow.Harvey was cast in the 2024 Sky Atlantic series Sweetpea.

Harvey's stage roles include Hortense in a 2019 National Theatre production of Small Island, Lisa in a 2022 Theatre Royal Stratford East production of The Wonderful World of Dissocia, and Rosalind in a 2022 @sohoplace production of As You Like It.

== Personal life ==
Harvey is gay and non-binary and prefers they/them pronouns.

== Filmography ==
Film
Year	Title	Role	Notes
2008	Dustbin Baby	Gina	Television Film
2016	On the Road	Estelle	
2019	Fighting with My Family	Hannah	
2023	Tuesday	Nurse Billie	
2024	The Assessment	Holly	
TBA	The Scurry	Officer Wainwright	Post-production

Television
Year	Title	Role	Notes
2017	Uncle	Nurse	Episode: "2:27"
2019	Les Misérables	Matelote	Guest role, 2 episodes
2021-2023	Foundation	Salvor Hardin	Main role (seasons 1–2)
2024	A Gentleman in Moscow	Marina Samarova	Main role
2024	Sweetpea	Marina	5 episodes
2024	Secret Level	Cassidy Taimak (voice)	Episode: "Concord: Tale of the Implacable"
