= Lou Llobell =

Zimbabwean actress

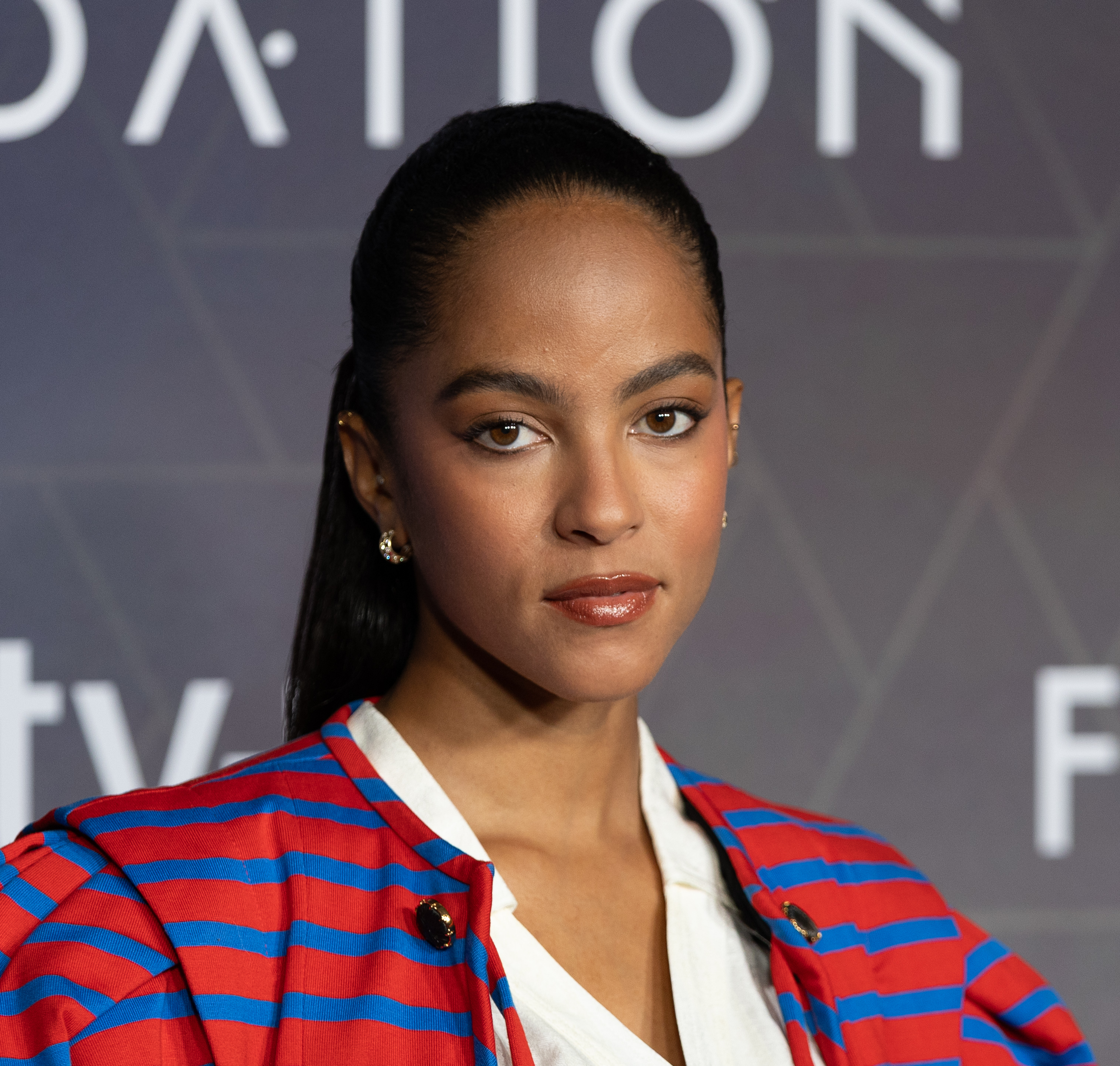
- Llobell in 2025
- Born: 18 January 1995 (age 31); Zimbabwe
- Education: University of Birmingham; Drama Centre London
- Occupation: Actress
- Years active: 2018–present

Lou Llobell (born 18 January 1995) is a Spanish-Zimbabwean actress, known for her role as Gaal Dornick in the TV series Foundation.

== Early life ==
Lou Llobell was born in Zimbabwe to a Spanish father and Zimbabwean mother. She grew up in Spain and South Africa.

She moved to England in 2013 to study drama at the University of Birmingham where she graduated with a Bachelor of Arts in Drama and Theatre Arts in 2016, before enrolling at the Drama Centre London in 2016 where she graduated with a Master of Arts in 2018.

== Filmography ==
Film and television
Year	Title	Role	Notes
2021	Voyagers	Zandie	Film
2021	The Pilgrim	Claire	Film
2021–present	Foundation	Gaal Dornick	Television series
2026	Passenger	Maddie Brecker	Film
