= Passenger (2026 film) =

Film by André Øvredal

- Theatrical release poster
- Directed by: André Øvredal
- Written by: Zachary Donohue; T.W. Burgess
- Produced by: Walter Hamada; Gary Dauberman
- Starring: Jacob Scipio; Lou Llobell; Melissa Leo
- Cinematography: Federico Verardi
- Edited by: Martin Bernfeld
- Music by: Christopher Young
- Production companies: 18Hz Productions; Coin Operated
- Distributed by: Paramount Pictures
- Release date: May 22, 2026
- Running time: 94 minutes
- Country: United States
- Language: English
- Budget: $15 million
- Box office: $31.6 million

Passenger is a 2026 American supernatural horror film directed by André Øvredal. The film stars Jacob Scipio, Lou Llobell, and Melissa Leo. The story follows a young couple who, after witnessing a highway accident, become haunted by a demonic entity during their road trip.

Passenger was released in the United States by Paramount Pictures on May 22, 2026. The film received mixed reviews from critics and grossed $31 million against a reported $15 million production budget.

== Plot ==
Two friends, Daniel and Lucas, are driving down a dark road at night. While stopped on the side of the road for Lucas to urinate, Daniel is suddenly killed by an unseen attacker and Lucas flees.

Elsewhere, couple Maddie and Tyler are celebrating six weeks of being on the road, having recently left their jobs and taken up the van life lifestyle. They pull over on a residential street to camp for the night, where Tyler proposes to Maddie, who accepts. After a neighborhood watch member tells them they are not permitted to camp on the street, the two hit the road again. While driving on a remote highway, Lucas speeds ahead of their van frantically. Moments later, Maddie and Tyler pull over when they see Lucas’ car crashed against a tree. Lucas tries to crawl out of the passenger seat, but is pulled back inside by an unseen force and killed.

In the morning, the couple sees that their van has three claw marks, similar to the ones on Lucas’ car. At a gathering of other van-lifers, Maddie goes through the other tents and sees pictures of missing people, as well as a stick figure with three lines going through its body. She meets a woman named Diana and mentions stopping for a car accident the night before. Diana’s tone becomes ominous, as she warns Maddie not to stop on the road at night.

Later that night, Maddie sees the mysterious figure in a parking lot. She looks at the dashcam footage of Lucas’ car before the crash and sees the figure sitting next to him in the car. Suddenly, the figure enters the van and tries to strangle Maddie with her seatbelt, but she burns its hand with a St. Christopher medallion. Maddie rushes out of the van and tells Tyler, but the figure has vanished.

Maddie learns there have been other incidents of travelers going missing after their vehicles have been seen with the claw marks. While researching she learns of the Hobo code, that warn travelers of danger - the claw mark designating "not safe here". The figure that she saw is known as the "Passenger”, which haunts and kills travelers. While camping, the Passenger attacks Tyler and Maddie, forcing them to flee. Maddie suggests to Tyler that they get to Flagstaff to find Diana, as she may know how to get rid of the Passenger.

Just before sunset, the couple gets a flat tire. The Passenger appears, takes Maddie and crushes Tyler's leg under the van. After escaping and changing the tire, Tyler drives off to find Maddie. Maddie awakens outside another car crash. The Passenger takes the form of Tyler to trick Maddie, but is thwarted by the lights of the van as Tyler approaches. The couple arrive at Diana's camp. She tells Maddie and Tyler that there was a rumor of a traveler who was haunted by the Passenger, but sought refuge in the Church of St. Christopher. Diana offers to take them there, however the Passenger kills her.

The couple is traveling during the day time, but Maddie falls asleep and when she awakens, it is suddenly dark. They come across a Hobo symbol on a billboard, designating safety and leading them to a remote road where they believe the church will be. The Passenger continuously plays tricks on them in an attempt to stop them, however Tyler fights them off. Tyler is pulled out of the van and Maddie keeps driving until the Passenger is flung through the windshield. Arriving at the church, Maddie rams the van into the Passenger, impaling it on a statue and killing it. Tyler reunites with Maddie and the two agree to buy a house as emergency vehicles arrive.

== Cast ==
- Jacob Scipio as Tyler Genocchio
- Lou Llobell as Maddie Brecker
- Melissa Leo as Diana Larson
- Joseph Lopez as "the Passenger", a demonic entity
- Miles Fowler as Lucas Tedesco
- Alan Trong as Daniel

== Production ==
In October 2024, it was announced that André Øvredal would be directing a new horror film, with the script written by T.W. Burgess and Zachary Donohue, and produced by Walter Hamada and Gary Dauberman. In January 2025, Melissa Leo, Lou Llobell and Jacob Scipio joined the cast, with principal photography beginning that month. Christopher Young had composed the score.

== Release ==
Passenger was released in the United States by Paramount Pictures on May 22, 2026. It was originally scheduled for May 29, 2026, but was moved up a week to avoid competition with Backrooms and Scary Movie, another Paramount film.

== Reception ==
On the review aggregator website Rotten Tomatoes, 44% of 97 critics' reviews are positive, with an average rating of 5.3/10. The website's consensus reads: "A stylish ride weighed down by the litany of clichés it picks up along the way, Passenger drives in circles but has some memorable bumps and jolts during the journey." Metacritic, which uses a weighted average, assigned the film a score of 52 out of 100, based on 14 critics, indicating "mixed or average" reviews. Audiences surveyed by CinemaScore gave the film an average grade of "B−" on an A+ to F scale.
