= Foundation (Asimov novel) =

1951 science fiction novel by Isaac Asimov

- Dust-jacket of the first edition
- Author: Isaac Asimov
- Cover artist: David Kyle
- Language: English
- Series: Foundation series
- Genre: Science fiction, political drama
- Publisher: Gnome Press
- Publication date: August 30, 1951
- Publication place: United States
- Media type: Print (hardback & paperback)
- Pages: 255
- Award: Retro Hugo for Best Novelette for "Foundation", aka "The Encyclopedists" (1943, awarded 2018)
- Followed by: Foundation and Empire

Foundation is a science fiction novel by American writer Isaac Asimov. It is the first book in the Foundation Trilogy (which later expanded into the Foundation series). Foundation is a cycle of five interrelated short stories, first published as a single book by Gnome Press in 1951. Collectively they tell the early story of the Foundation, an institute founded by psychohistorian Hari Seldon to preserve the best of galactic civilization after his predicted collapse of the Galactic Empire.

== Publication history ==
On August 1, 1941, Isaac Asimov proposed to John W. Campbell of Astounding Science Fiction that he write a short story set in a slowly declining Galactic Empire, based on the fall of the Western Roman Empire. Campbell liked the idea; by the end of a two-hour meeting, Asimov planned to write a series of stories depicting the fall of the first Galactic Empire and the rise of the second. Asimov wrote seven more stories for Campbell's magazine over eight years, and they were later collected into three book volumes known as The Foundation Trilogy (1951–1953).

Of these, "Foundation" (retitled as "The Encyclopedists" for the book collection) was published in Astounding in May 1942; "Bridle and Saddle" (retitled "The Mayors" for the collection) in June 1942; "The Big and the Little" (retitled "The Merchant Princes" for the collection) in August 1944; and "The Wedge" (retitled "The Traders" for the collection) in October 1944. Collected as Foundation in 1951, these four stories were accompanied by "The Psychohistorians", a book-exclusive prologue story. The remaining four novellas were collected as Foundation and Empire (1952) and Second Foundation (1953).

The Foundation Trilogy won a Hugo Award for Best All-Time Series in 1966.

== Plot summary ==
=== "The Psychohistorians" ===
In 12,067 G.E. ("Galactic Era"), mathematician and psychologist Hari Seldon has developed psychohistory, a new field of science and psychology that allows for the probabilistic prediction of future events. By means of psychohistory, Seldon has discovered the decline and eventual fall of the Galactic Empire, angering its rulers, the Commission of Public Safety. The frame story is told from the perspective of Gaal of Synnax, a young apprentice to Hari Seldon, seeing this empire's governing world of Trantor for the first time, and immediately falling into this galactic disaster. Seldon defends his beliefs, and the Commission, not wanting to make Seldon a martyr, offers him exile to a remote world, Terminus.

=== "The Encyclopedists" ===
In 50 F.E. ("Foundation Era"), the Encyclopedia Foundation, tasked with preserving the Empire's knowledge, is established on the mineral-poor agricultural planet Terminus, and occupies the planet's single large settlement, Terminus City. The city's affairs are managed by its first Mayor, Salvor Hardin, under the authority of the Board, hidebound scholars whose main concern is publishing the Encyclopedia. Hardin believes Terminus is in danger of conquest by the four neighboring prefectures of the Empire, the strongest of which is Anacreon. When the Board resists Hardin's efforts against the threat, he and his chief advisor, Yohan Lee, seize power. Hardin then visits the three weaker kingdoms and convinces them that they must unite to prevent the Foundation's nuclear technology from falling into the hands of Anacreon alone. The three issue a joint ultimatum that all be allowed to receive nuclear power from Terminus, making it indispensable to all and protected by a delicate balance of power. A vault containing Seldon's recorded messages opens, and reveals that he had planned this whole course of events by means of psychohistory, and that the Foundation is destined to grow into a new galactic empire.

=== "The Mayors" ===
Decades later, the Foundation has established a techno-religious hegemony over the four surrounding planetary kingdoms, based on its superior nuclear technology operated under a cloak of mysticism. During a visit of the Foundation's Mayor Hardin to the kingdom of Anacreon, the power-hungry Prince Regent Wienis and his teenage nephew, King Lepold I, launch a surprise attack against Terminus using a salvaged Imperial battlecruiser, but Hardin had directed the Foundation's repair engineers to install a secret kill switch into the cruiser, causing the crew to mutiny. The ship's commander, Wienis's son, is captured and forced to broadcast a message of surrender to Anacreon, while all the planet's nuclear power goes dark. With his people in revolt, the enraged Wienis tries to shoot down Hardin with an energy blaster, but Hardin is shielded by a personal force field, and Wienis turns the weapon on himself. The Foundation's mission continues, as foreseen by Seldon.

=== "The Traders" ===
After further decades, the Foundation is expanding its influence over hundreds of planets by trading its superior technology for raw materials. Master Trader Eskel Gorov travels to the world of Askone, hoping to introduce atomics. He is met with resistance by Askone's governing Elders, who enforce a traditional religion forbidding advanced technology. Gorov is imprisoned and sentenced to death.

The Foundation sends Trader Limmar Ponyets to negotiate. He meets with the Elders' Grand Master and surmises he may be willing to exchange Gorov for a suitable bribe. Ponyets fashions a crude transmuter that will convert iron into gold, the supreme treasure on the planet. He eventually sells the transmuter to Councilor Pherl, the Grand Master's ambitious protégé, who needs gold to buy support. However, the transmuter soon breaks down, and Pherl is blackmailed by a video recording of himself using the forbidden technology.

Allying with the compromised Pherl, Ponyets wins Gorov's release, an ample supply of tin, and most importantly Pherl's cooperation in breaking down the religious taboos. The Foundation techno-religion advances to another planet.

=== "The Merchant Princes" ===
Three Foundation vessels have vanished near the Republic of Korell, suggesting either independent technological development or buying smuggled Foundation weapons. The political boss Manlio and scheming councilman Sutt send Master Trader Hober Mallow to investigate, hoping to get rid of him as a rival. Mallow invites another opponent of the political machine, Jaim Twer. When the Master Trader lands at the Korell spaceport, a man identifying himself as "Reverend Jord Parma" appears, saying he is a Foundation missionary hunted by the Korellians, who have forbidden the Foundation's techno-religion. Suspecting a set-up, Mallow decides to turn the missionary over to the Korellian mob.

Mallow discovers that the Empire has been providing weapons to client states on the Foundation's borders. He journeys alone to the planet Siwenna, a former Imperial capital. He meets the impoverished patrician Onum Barr, who explains the chaotic political situation in the dying Empire.

After his return to Terminus, Mallow is put on trial for surrendering the Foundation missionary to the murderous mob. He reveals that Jaim Twer was working as Sutt's agent. Further, he produces a recording revealing that the "missionary" was in fact a Korellian secret policeman sent to provoke violence as a pretext for war against the Foundation. Acquitted, Mallow is lionized by the population of Terminus and elected as the new Mayor. He has Sutt and Manlio arrested.

As Mayor, Mallow soon faces war with Korell. He imposes an embargo on Korell, which eventually collapses due to its dependence on Foundation technology. However, Mallow realizes that the Religious Power has outlived its usefulness, and further expansion will be on the basis of trade alone.

== Characters ==
=== "The Psychohistorians" ===
- Hari Seldon, mathematician who develops psychohistory
- Gaal Dornick, mathematician and Seldon's biographer
- Jerril, an agent of the Commission of Public Safety who watches Gaal Dornick
- Linge Chen, chief commissioner of public safety, and judge of Seldon's trial
- Lors Avakim, the lawyer appointed to defend Gaal Dornick

=== "The Encyclopedists" ===
- Salvor Hardin, First Mayor of Terminus
- Anselm haut Rodric, soldier and Envoy from Anacreon to Terminus
- Bor Alurin, Trantorian psychologist who trained Salvor Hardin
- Jord Fara, Member of the Board of Trustees of the Encyclopedia Committee
- Lewis Pirenne, chairman of the Board of Trustees of the Encyclopedia Committee
- Lundin Crast, Member of the Board of Trustees of the Encyclopedia Committee
- Lord Dorwin, Chancellor of the Empire
- Tomaz Sutt, Member of the Board of Trustees of the Encyclopedia Committee
- Yate Fulham, Member of the Board of Trustees of the Encyclopedia Committee
- Yohan Lee, one of Salvor Hardin's advisors and friends

=== "The Mayors" ===
- Dokor Walto, Foundation Action Party activist
- Jaim Orsy, Foundation Action Party activist
- King Lepold I, King of Anacreon
- Lem Tarki, Foundation Action Party activist
- Levi Norast, Foundation Action Party activist
- Lewis Bort, Foundation Action Party activist
- Prince Lefkin, Wienis's eldest son
- Prince Regent Wienis, Prince Regent of Anacreon, uncle of King Lepold I
- Poly Verisof, Foundation ambassador and High Priest on Anacreon
- Salvor Hardin, First Mayor of Terminus
- Sef Sermak, Terminus City Councilor
- Theo Aporat, head priest on Anacreon's flagship Wienis
- Yohan Lee, organizer of Salvor Hardin's coup and close confidante of Hardin

=== "The Traders" ===
- Eskel Gorov, Master Trader and Foundation agent sentenced to death on Askone
- Limmar Ponyets, Master Trader, liberates Gorov in exchange for a transmuter
- Les Gorm, Master Trader and knows Linmar Ponyets from trading

=== "The Merchant Princes" ===
- Hober Mallow, Master Trader and first of the Merchant Princes
- Publis Manlio, Foreign Secretary of the Foundation
- Jorane Sutt, Secretary to the Mayor of the Foundation
- Jaim Twer, Foundation agent planted on Mallow's ship

== Reception ==
Writing after the 1951 publication of the five stories as a single book, reviewer Groff Conklin declared Foundation "a book of real intellectual entertainment and adventure", while Anthony Boucher and J. Francis McComas found it "competent enough writing and thinking, if on the dull side." At the same time, P. Schuyler Miller received the volume favorably, but noted that the "revision and inter-writing" of the component stories was "not quite so successful a job" as Asimov had managed with I, Robot. In 1966, the Foundation trilogy won the Hugo Award for Best All-Time Series.

Writing in 2011, Gizmodo singled out "The Psychohistorians" as "the perfect introduction to the Foundation series, a mini-masterpiece of world-building that helps you understand exactly what the Foundation is trying to do and, more importantly, why it all matters in slightly more than abstract terms." io9 included the book on its 2012 list of "10 Science Fiction Novels You Pretend to Have Read".

Although Hugo Awards were established only in 1953, too late for the novel to be eligible, all four stories originally published in Astounding Science Fiction were later retroactively nominated for Retro-Hugo Awards, one of them winning the 1943 Retro-Hugo Award for the Best Novelette (of 1942):

- the novelette "Foundation" (later retitled into the chapter "The Encyclopedists") won a retrospective 1943 Hugo Award for the Best Novelette (of 1942) in 2018;
- "Bridle and Saddle" (later retitled into the chapter "The Mayors") was 5th among the novelettes nominated for a retrospective 1943 Hugo Award for the Best Novelette (of 1942) in 2018;
- "The Wedge" (later retitled into the chapter "The Traders") was 4th among the short stories nominated for a retrospective 1945 Hugo Award for the Best Short Story (of 1944) in 2020.
- "The Big and the Little" (later retitled into the chapter "The Merchant Princes") tied for the 5th place among novelettes nominated for a retrospective 1945 Hugo Award for the Best Novelette (of 1944) in 2020.
