= Hari Seldon =

Fictional character from the Foundation series by Isaac Asimov

- Foundation character
- Hari Seldon, as depicted on the 1986 US reprint cover of Foundation. Art by Michael Whelan.
- First appearance: "Foundation" (1942)
- Last appearance: Foundation's Triumph (1999)
- Created by: Isaac Asimov
- Portrayed by: Jared Harris; Foundation (2021–present)
- Voiced by: William Eedle; The Foundation Trilogy (1973)

In-universe information
- Gender: Male
- Occupation: Mathematician; Psychologist; Imperial First Minister
- Affiliation: Foundation; Second Foundation; Streeling University
- Spouses: Dors Venabili (novels); Yanna Seldon (TV series)
- Children: Raych Seldon (adopted)

Hari Seldon is a fictional character in the Foundation series of novels by Isaac Asimov. In his capacity as mathematics professor at Streeling University on the planet Trantor, Seldon develops psychohistory, an algorithmic science that allows him to predict the future in probabilistic terms. On the basis of his psychohistory he is able to predict the eventual fall of the Galactic Empire and to develop a means to shorten the millennia of chaos to follow.

In the first five books of the Foundation series, Hari Seldon made only one in-the-flesh appearance, in the first part of the first book (Foundation), although he did appear at other times in pre-recorded messages to reveal a "Seldon Crisis". After writing five books in chronological order, Asimov wrote two prequels to expand on the genesis of psychohistory. The two prequels—Prelude to Foundation and Forward the Foundation—describe Seldon's life in considerable detail. He is also the central character of the Second Foundation Trilogy written after Asimov's death (Foundation's Fear by Gregory Benford, Foundation and Chaos by Greg Bear, and Foundation's Triumph by David Brin), which are set after Asimov's two prequels.

Seldon is voiced by William Eedle in several episodes of the 1973 BBC Radio 4 adaptation The Foundation Trilogy, and portrayed by Jared Harris in the 2021 Apple TV+ television series adaptation Foundation.

== Appearances ==
Hari Seldon is first mentioned in the short story "Foundation", published in Astounding Science Fiction in May 1942, as the creator of psychohistory, and appears as a prerecorded hologram near the end. The story was renamed "The Encyclopedists" and collected with four others as Foundation in 1951. "The Psychohistorians" depicts Seldon put on trial by the Commission of Public Safety for his dire predictions about the eventual fall of the Galactic Empire, after which he is exiled to the distant planet Terminus. Seldon's prerecorded messages continue to appear in Foundation and Empire (1952) and Second Foundation (1953), as well as the later sequels, Foundation's Edge (1982) and Foundation and Earth (1986). He is featured as the main character in Asimov's two prequels, Prelude to Foundation (1988) and Forward the Foundation (1993).

Describing "The Psychohistorians" as "28 pages of nonstop world-building", Josh Wimmer and Alasdair Wilkins of Gizmodo wrote that in the story, "Hari Seldon isn't so much a character as he is the living embodiment of psychohistory, an ethereal presence who's about as relatable as Gandalf. It wouldn't be until Prelude to Foundation ... that Seldon would become an actual character."

== Storyline ==
=== Fictional biography ===
Galactic Empire First Minister and psychohistorian Hari Seldon was born in the 10th month of the 11,988th year of the Galactic Era (GE) (−79 Foundation Era (FE)) and died 12,069 GE (1 FE). (Note: According to the Encyclopedia Galactica (Asimov's fictitious encyclopedia often cited in his future history novels), "It is thought that Seldon's birthdate, which some consider doubtful, may have been adjusted to match that of Cleon's" the last Galactic Emperor of the Entun Dynasty (Prelude to Foundation, p. 3).) (Note: In Asimov's saga, the Galactic Era begins when the Galactic Empire is founded at an unknown date roughly 11,000 years in the future: The timeline can be deduced from some hints Asimov dropped in his other science fiction works, including the Robot and Empire series.)

He was born on the planet Helicon in the Arcturus sector where his father worked as a tobacco grower in a hydroponics plant. He shows incredible mathematical abilities at a very early age.

HARI SELDON–… born in the 11,988th year of the Galactic Era; died 12,069. The dates are more commonly given in terms of the current Foundational Era as −79 to the year 1 F.E. Born to middle-class parents on Helicon, Arcturus sector (where his father, in a legend of doubtful authenticity, was a tobacco grower in the hydroponic plants of the planet), he showed amazing abilities in mathematics from an early age. Anecdotes concerning his ability are innumerable, and some are contradictory. At the age of two, he is said to have …

He also learns martial arts on Helicon that later help him on Trantor, the principal art being Heliconian Twisting (a form seemingly equal parts jiu-jitsu, Krav Maga, and submission wrestling). Helicon is said to be "less notable for its mathematics, and more for its martial arts" (Prelude to Foundation). Seldon is awarded a Ph.D. in mathematics for his work on turbulence at the University of Helicon. There he becomes an assistant professor specializing in the mathematical analysis of social structures.

Seldon is the subject of a biography by Gaal Dornick. Seldon is Emperor Cleon I's second and last First Minister, the first being Eto Demerzel/R. Daneel Olivaw. He is deposed as First Minister after Cleon I's assassination.

Seldon, Hari— . . . found dead, slumped over desk in his office at Streeling University in 12,069 (1 F.E.). Apparently Seldon had been working up to his last moments on psychohistorical equations; his activated Prime Radiant was discovered clutched in hand. According to Seldon’s instructions, the instrument was shipped by his colleague Gaal Dornick who had recently emigrated to Terminus. Seldon's body was jettisoned into space, also in accordance with instructions he’d left. The official memorial service on Trantor was simple, though attended. It was worth noting that Seldon’s old friend former First Minister Eto Demerzel attended the event. Demerzel had not been seen since his mysterious disappearance immediately following the Joranumite Conspiracy during the reign of Emperor Cleon I. Attempts by the Commission of Public Safety to locate Demerzel in the days following the Seldon memorial proved to be unsuccessful. Wanda Seldon, Hari Seldon's granddaughter, did not attend the ceremony. It was rumored that she was grief-stricken and had refused all public appearances. To this day, her whereabouts from then on remain unknown. It has been said that Hari Seldon left this life as lived it, for he died with the future he created unfolding all around him.

=== Foundation ===
Using psychohistory, Seldon mathematically determines what he calls The Seldon Plan—a plan to determine the right time and place to set up a new society, one that would replace the collapsing Galactic Empire by sheer force of social pressure, but over only a thousand-year time span, rather than the ten-to-thirty-thousand-year time span that would normally have been required, and thus reduce the human suffering from living in a time of barbarism. The Foundation is placed on Terminus, a remote and resource-poor planet entirely populated by scientists and their families. The planet—or so Seldon claimed—was originally occupied to create the Encyclopedia Galactica, a vast compilation of the knowledge of a dying galactic empire. In reality, Terminus had a much larger role in his Plan, which he had to conceal from its inhabitants at first.

=== Prelude to Foundation ===
Seldon visits Trantor to attend the Decennial Mathematics Convention. He presents a paper which indicates that one could theoretically predict the Galactic Empire's future. He is able to show that Galactic society can be represented in a simulation simpler than itself (in a finite number of iterations before the onset of chaotic noise smears discerning sets of events). He does so using a technique invented that past century. At first, Seldon has no idea how this could be done in practice, and he is fairly confident that no one could actually fulfill the possibility. Shortly after his presentation, he becomes a lightning rod for political forces who want to use psychohistory for their own purposes. The rest of the novel tells of his flight, which lasts for approximately a year and which takes him through the complex and variegated world of Trantor. During his flight to escape the various political factions, he discovers how psychohistory can be made a practical science. It is in this novel that he meets his future wife Dors Venabili, future adopted son Raych Seldon, and future partner Yugo Amaryl.

=== Forward the Foundation ===
This novel is told as a sequence of short stories, as was the case with the original trilogy. They take place at intervals a decade or more apart, and tell the story of Hari's life, starting about ten years after Prelude and ending with his death. The stories contrast his increasingly successful professional life with his increasingly unsuccessful personal life.

Seldon becomes involved in politics when Eto Demerzel becomes a target for a smear campaign conducted by Laskin Joranum. He eventually takes Demerzel's place as First Minister, despite his reluctance to divide his attention between government and the development of Psychohistory. His career comes to an end when Cleon I is assassinated by his gardener (a random event Seldon could not have predicted) and the seizure of power by a military junta. Seldon eventually causes the fall of the junta by dropping subtle false hints about what Psychohistory foresees, leading to the Junta making unpopular decisions. However, an agent of the Junta inside Seldon's team, having deduced that Dors is a robot, builds a device that ultimately kills her, leaving Seldon heartbroken. Years later, Seldon discovers that his granddaughter Wanda has telepathic abilities and begins searching for others like her but fails. Raych eventually decides to move his family to the planet Santanni, but Wanda chooses to remain with her elderly grandfather. However, just after they arrive a rebellion breaks out on the planet and Raych is killed in the fighting. His wife and child are lost when their ship disappears. Seldon eventually finds Stettin Palver, another telepath who becomes Wanda's husband and the pair are eventually instrumental in creating the Second Foundation.

Seldon mentions two indigenous species of Helicon: the lamec and the greti. The first is a hardworking animal, while the latter is dangerous as indicated by the native Helicon saying "If you ride a greti, you find you can't get off; for then it will eat you." The saying is similar to the age-old Chinese proverb "He who rides the tiger finds it difficult to dismount", and the words lamec and greti are anagrams of camel and tiger, respectively.

In his old age, he gains the nickname Raven for his dire predictions of the future.

== In adaptations ==
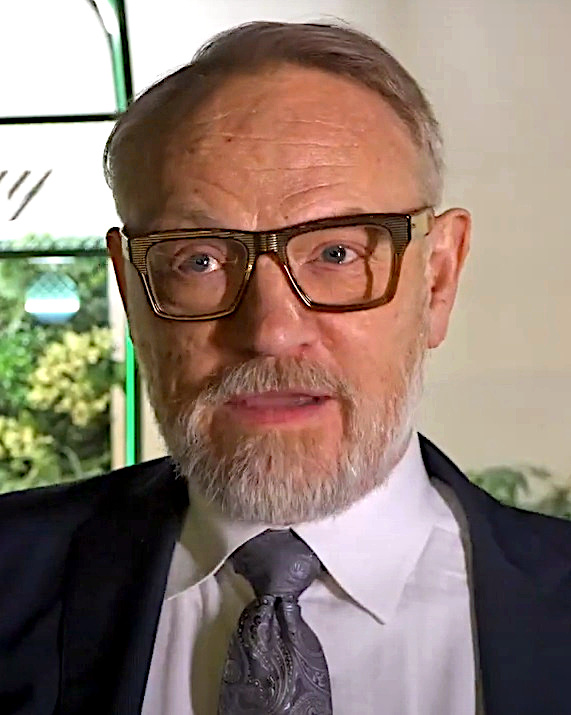
Jared Harris portrays Hari Seldon in the 2021 TV series.

Seldon is voiced by William Eedle in several episodes of the 1973 BBC Radio 4 adaptation The Foundation Trilogy.

Seldon is portrayed by Jared Harris in the 2021 Apple TV+ television series adaptation Foundation. His casting was announced in October 2019.

== Contemporary influence ==
Historian Ian Morris has discussed the applicability and inspiration of Hari Seldon to statistics and prediction. Hari Seldon's name is cited in an article in The Economist discussing the use of statistics in epidemiology, the process through which societies change collective political thinking, and "a general computer model of society." Seldon is also quite often named in research as a metaphorical literary reference point.

Phil Pinn speculated in Forbes that Seldon's psychohistory is being manifested in today's emergence of Big Data. Tom Boellstorff called Seldon has even been labeled a "paradigmatic figure" in Big Data research. In 2019, the term Seldonian algorithm was chosen to honor the character in new artificial intelligence techniques intended to avoid undesirable behaviors in decision-making systems.

People who credit to Hari Seldon for the career choices that they made include economist and New York Times columnist Paul Krugman and US politician Newt Gingrich. French politician Jean-Luc Mélenchon also cites Seldon as one of his metapolitical sources of inspiration.
