= Galactic Empire series =

Science fiction trilogy of Isaac Asimov's earliest novels, extended by a short story

- "Blind Alley" (1945); Pebble in the Sky (1950); The Stars, Like Dust (1951); The Currents of Space (1952)
- Author: Isaac Asimov
- Country: United States
- Language: English
- Published: March 1945 – 1952

The Galactic Empire series (also called the Empire novels or trilogy) is a science fiction sequence of three of Isaac Asimov's earliest novels, and extended by one short story. They are connected by their early place in his published works and chronological placement within his overarching Foundation universe, set around the rise of Asimov's Galactic Empire, between the Robot and Foundation series to which they were linked in Asimov's later novels.

== Works in the series ==
In order of internal chronology the Empire series consists of:

1. The Stars, Like Dust (1951), novel
2. The Currents of Space (1952), novel
3. Pebble in the Sky (1950), his first novel
4. "Blind Alley" (1945), a short story also set between the Robot and Foundation series

However, Asimov stated in 1988 in the "Author's Note" to Prelude to Foundation that book #6 was "The Currents of Space" (1952), and that this was "the first of my Empire novels," and that book #7 was "The Stars, Like Dust" (1951), which was "[the] second Empire novel."

== Publication history ==
The three Empire books, first published between 1950 and 1952, are Asimov's three earliest novels published in his own name (David Starr, Space Ranger was published before The Currents of Space, but had been published under his pen name "Paul French", and the Foundation books were collections of linked short stories rather than continuous novels).

Pebble in the Sky was originally written in the summer of 1947 under the title "Grow Old with Me" for Startling Stories, whose editor Sam Merwin, Jr. had approached Asimov to write a forty thousand word short novel for the magazine. The title was adapted from Robert Browning's Rabbi ben Ezra, the first few lines of which (starting "Grow old along with me! / The best is yet to be...") were included in the final novel. It was rejected by Startling Stories on the basis that the magazine's emphasis was more on adventure than science-heavy fiction (despite the editor having invited Asimov to write the latter as an experiment for the magazine), and again by John W. Campbell, Asimov's usual editor. In 1949, Doubleday editor Walter I. Bradbury accepted the story on the suggestion of Frederik Pohl, on the condition it was expanded to seventy thousand words and the title changed to something more science fiction oriented; it was published in January 1950 as Pebble in the Sky. "Grow Old With Me" was later published in its original form along with other draft stories in The Alternate Asimovs in 1986.

The Stars, Like Dust was originally serialised under the title Tyrann in Galaxy Science Fiction from January to March 1951, and was published as a novel by Doubleday later that year. The first paperback edition was an Ace Books double novel along with Roger Dee's An Earth Gone Mad; The Stars, Like Dust was retitled The Rebellious Stars for this edition without Asimov's consent. The novel was reprinted in with the Foundation Trilogy, The Naked Sun and I, Robot in a hardback selected works edition in 1982 by Littlehampton Book Services.

The Currents of Space was originally serialised in Astounding Science Fiction from October to December 1952 before being published by Doubleday as a novel the same year.

The books have been reprinted a number of times as a trilogy (as well as many times separately): in 1986 by Ballantine Books as "Galactic Empire Novel[s]", in 1992 by Spectra as "The Empire Novels" and in 2010 along with The End of Eternity by Orb Books, in both print and Kindle editions.

After the publication of The Currents of Space in 1952, all three novels (the only Asimov novels published at that time) were collected into an omnibus titled Triangle. They were republished again as a single volume, The Empire Novels, in 2002 by the Science Fiction Book Club.

"Blind Alley" was published before any of the novels; written in 1944, it was accepted by John W. Campbell later that year and published in Astounding Science Fiction in March 1945. It was anthologised by Groff Conklin in The Best of Science Fiction, the first of Asimov's stories to have been reprinted, and was later included in The Early Asimov (in 1972, along with a very brief history of its origins), The Asimov Chronicles in 1989 and in volume 2 of The Complete Stories in 1992. It has never been published together with the novels, as it is connected only on the basis of being set during the Galactic Empire, after the Robot stories and before the Foundation series.

== Development and themes ==
These stories are set in the same future as the Foundation series, which had appeared in magazines starting in 1942. The tie is not close, and they are only loosely connected to each other, each being a complete tale in its own right. Their main common points are Asimov's idea of a future Galactic Empire, certain aspects of technology — hyperdrive, blaster pistols, "neuronic whips", the possible invention of the "Visi-Sonor" — and particular locations, such as the planet Trantor. Another connection was later established with Robots and Empire, where Asimov revealed how Earth became radioactive, as mentioned in all three novels. Some sources further this argument by asserting that The Stars, Like Dust takes place about one thousand years following the events of Robots and Empire. Also, the calendar used on spaceships in The Stars, Like Dust is the same that the Spacers introduce Lije Baley to in The Robots of Dawn.

The short story "Blind Alley" is the only story set in the Foundation universe to feature intelligence not of human origin; Foundation and Earth features non-human intelligences (of Solaria and Gaia), but they are descended from or created by humans.

Asimov later integrated them into his all-engulfing Foundation universe. Some contortion was required to explain how the robots of the Robot series are almost completely absent from the Galactic Empire novels. In reality, this is because Asimov wrote the original Robot and Foundation short stories as separate series.

== Sources ==
Foundation universe
| Preceded by Robot series | Galactic Empire series 1945–1952 | Succeeded by Foundation series |
