= Blind Alley =

Science fiction short story by Isaac Asimov

- Short story by Isaac Asimov
- Country: United States
- Language: English
- Genre: Science fiction

Publication
- Published in: Astounding Science Fiction
- Publication type: Periodical
- Publisher: Street & Smith
- Media type: Print (Magazine, Hardback & Paperback)
- Publication date: March 1945

Chronology
- Series: Empire series
Pebble in the Sky	Prelude to Foundation

"Blind Alley" is a science fiction short story by American writer Isaac Asimov. It was first published in the March 1945 issue of Astounding Science Fiction, and later included in the collection The Early Asimov (1972).

Although the story postulates a race of intelligent non-humans, it is set in the Foundation universe, during the era of Trantor's Galactic Empire.

== Publication history ==
"Blind Alley" was the only story from mid-1943 to mid-1945 that was not part of Asimov's Foundation or Robot series. Written in September and October 1944, it was accepted by John W. Campbell in October and published in Astounding Science Fiction in March 1945. It was anthologised by Groff Conklin in The Best of Science Fiction, the first of Asimov's stories to have been reprinted. The $42.50 from the anthology caused him to realize that it was possible to earn more money from a story than the initial publication.

Conklin included the story in a number of anthologies: the 1963 edition of The Best of Science Fiction, Great Stories of Space Travel also published that year and The Golden Age of Science Fiction in 1980. It also appeared in Isaac Asimov Presents the Great SF Stories 7 edited by Asimov and Martin H. Greenberg in 1982, and Intergalactic Empires edited by Asimov, Greenberg and Charles G. Waugh in 1983. Asimov included it in his own The Early Asimov in 1972, The Asimov Chronicles in 1989, and in volume 2 of The Complete Stories in 1992.

== Plot summary ==
The few remaining members of the only intelligent non-human alien race the Galactic Empire has discovered have been removed from their dying planet and transferred to the much more pleasant Cepheus-18 (hence their name, "Cepheids"). The planet is a combination of zoo, laboratory, and reservation for the creatures. The scientists that study the Cepheids differ on whether to treat them as sentient beings or as animals, but agree that the aliens are in danger of extinction as they have ceased to reproduce. While the administrator already suspects that this is due to a certain ennui, the Cepheids' leader later admits personally that while their race would likely have soon died out on its dangerous home world as their science only covered their biological needs; they have nothing to live for in a galaxy completely ruled by humans who provide for all their physical needs, and they are prohibited from leaving the Empire.

The civilian supervisor, a career administrator, attempts to help the creatures using his thorough knowledge of the Imperial bureaucracy. By carefully orchestrating a leak of a report he himself arranged, he causes the bureaucracy to make the reproduction problem a priority. Then, he arranges for the Cepheids to receive pilot training under the guise of providing them with a challenge. And finally, by using a crude form of telepathy during an interview with their leader, he gets the leader to express interest in a bulky object, so that he can manipulate the bureaucracy into arranging to deliver a large quantity of these to the Cepheids with a fleet of hundreds of spaceships.

His plan works; the Cepheids commandeer the ships, catching the humans off-guard without any nearby ships with which to mount a pursuit. It is hinted that they have left for the Magellanic Clouds to find a new world of their own. The supervisor has protected himself from any blame for the escape by his ingenious bureaucratic maneuvers, and is placed on leave pending reassignment.

== Historical context ==
The author utilizes a turgid bureaucratic style of phraseology for the many memoranda that are a part of the story; this was based on what was in use by the U.S. Navy, Asimov's employers at the Philadelphia Navy Yard.

The aliens' predicament in a human-dominated galaxy is similar to the eventual fate of humans in the alternative futures of The End of Eternity. It does however have a very different ending — the Cepheids steal the spacecraft and head for an independent life in the Magellanic Clouds.

The Foundation and Earth character Golan Trevize says that no human ship has ever penetrated the Magellanic Clouds, nor the Andromeda Galaxy or other more distant galaxies. It is not known whether Asimov intended to make a link between those novels and this short story.

== The Second Foundation trilogy ==
In the 'Second Foundation' trilogy, a series of books authorized by the estate of Asimov, a race of aliens within the Foundation Universe is mentioned who appear to be in circumstances similar to the Cepheids. Although they are not mentioned by name, a major character in this story is. A subplot in Foundation's Triumph investigates the problem raised in this story.

Preceded by: Pebble in the Sky	Included in: The Early Asimov	Series: Empire series Foundation Series	Followed by: Prelude to Foundation
