= Foundation universe =

Fictional universe created by Isaac Asimov

The Foundation universe describes a future history of humanity's colonization of the galaxy, spanning nearly 25,000 years, created through the gradual fusion of the Robot, Galactic Empire, and Foundation book series written by American author Isaac Asimov.

== Works set in the universe ==
=== Asimov's Greater Foundation series ===
==== Merging the Robot, the Empire and the Foundation series ====
The Foundation series is set in the same universe as Asimov's first published novel, Pebble in the Sky, although Foundation takes place about 10,000 years later. Pebble in the Sky became the basis for the Galactic Empire series. Then, at some unknown date (prior to writing Foundation's Edge) Asimov decided to merge the Foundation/Galactic Empire series with his Robot series. Thus, all three series are set in the same universe, giving them a combined length of 18 novels, and a total of about 1,500,000 words. The merger also created a time-span of the series of around 20,000 years.

The Stars, Like Dust states explicitly that the Earth is radioactive because of a nuclear war. Asimov later explained that the in-universe reason for this perception was that it was formulated by Earthmen many centuries after the event, and which had become distorted, due to the loss of much of their planetary history. This work is regarded by Asimov as part of the Empire series, but does not directly mention either Trantor or the other Spacer worlds. One character is said to have a Visi-Sonor, the same musical instrument that is played by the clown Magnifico in Foundation and Empire.

Asimov integrated the Robot series into his all-encompassing Foundation series, making the robot R. Daneel Olivaw appear again twenty thousand years later in the age of the Galactic Empire, in sequels and prequels to the original Foundation trilogy; and in the final book of the Robots series, Robots and Empire, Asimov describes how the worlds that later formed the Empire were settled, and how Earth became radioactive (which was first mentioned in Pebble in the Sky).

==== Asimov's "Author's Note" in Prelude to Foundation ====
The foreword to Prelude to Foundation contains the chronological ordering of Asimov's science fiction books. Asimov stated that the books of his Robot, Empire, and Foundation series "offer a kind of history of the future, which is, perhaps, not completely consistent, since I did not plan consistency, to begin with." Asimov also noted that the books in his list "were not written in the order in which (perhaps) they should be read". In the Author's Note, Asimov noted that there is room for a book between Robots and Empire and The Currents of Space, and that he could follow Foundation and Earth with additional volumes.

==== Standalone novels set in the universe ====
While not mentioned in the "Author's Note" of Prelude to Foundation, the novels The End of Eternity (1955), Nemesis (1989), and The Positronic Man (1992) (written by Robert Silverberg) are related to the greater Foundation series.

The End of Eternity is vaguely referenced in Foundation's Edge, where a Gaian character in Foundation and Earth mentions the Eternals, whose "task it was to choose a reality that would be most suitable to Humanity." (The End of Eternity also refers to a "Galactic Empire" within its story.) Asimov himself did not mention The End of Eternity in the series listing from Prelude to Foundation. As for Nemesis, it was written after Prelude to Foundation, but in the author's note Asimov explicitly states that the book is not part of the Foundation or Empire series, but that someday he might tie it to the others.

The stand-alone novel Nemesis is also in the same continuity; being referenced in Forward the Foundation, where Hari Seldon refers to a 20,000-year-old story of "a young woman that could communicate with an entire planet that circled a sun named Nemesis". Commentators noted that Nemesis contains barely disguised references to the Spacers and their calendar system, the Galactic Empire, and even to Hari Seldon which seem to have been deliberately placed for the purpose of later integration into the Foundation universe. According to Alasdair Wilkins, in a discussion posted on Gizmodo, "Asimov absolutely loves weird, elliptical structures. All three of his non-robot/Foundation science fiction novels — The End of Eternity, The Gods Themselves and Nemesis — leaned heavily on non-chronological narratives, and he does it with gusto in The Gods Themselves."

In The Robots of Dawn, Dr. Han Fastolfe briefly summarizes the story from "The Bicentennial Man" (1976), which was later expanded by Silverberg in The Positronic Man (1992).

==== Works set in universe ====
The foreword to Prelude to Foundation contains the chronological ordering of Asimov's science fiction books. Asimov stated that the books of his Robot, Galactic Empire, and Foundation series "offer a kind of history of the future, which is, perhaps, not completely consistent, since I did not plan consistency to begin with." Asimov also noted that the books in his list "were not written in the order in which (perhaps) they should be read."

Forward the Foundation does not appear in Asimov's list, as it had not yet been published at the time, and the order of the Empire novels in Asimov's list is not entirely consistent with other lists. For example, the 1983 Ballantine Books printing of The Robots of Dawn lists the Empire novels as: The Stars, Like Dust; The Currents of Space; and Pebble in the Sky.

The following works are listed in chronological order by narrative:

1. Robot series (I):
  1. I, Robot (1950) — a fixup novel composed of 9 short stories about robots, set in the 21st century (1998–2052) on Earth
  2. Short stories about robots, set from the 20th to 22nd centuries (1995–2180), collected in The Complete Robot (1982), Robot Dreams (1986), Robot Visions (1990) and Gold: The Final Science Fiction Collection (1995)
2. The Positronic Man (1992) — a standalone robot novel, written by Robert Silverberg, based on Asimov's 1976 novelette "The Bicentennial Man", set from the 22nd to 24th centuries (2160–2360)
3. Nemesis (1989) — a standalone novel, set in the 23rd century (2236) in a star system about 2 light years from Earth, when interstellar travel was new
4. Robot series (II):
  1. "Mother Earth" (1949) — short story, set in the 25th century (2421)
  2. The Caves of Steel (1954) — first novel, set in the 35th century (3421) on Earth
  3. The Naked Sun (1957) — second novel, set in the 35th century (3422) on the Spacer planet Solaria
  4. "Mirror Image" (1972) — short story, set in the 35th century (3423)
  5. The Robots of Dawn (1983) — third novel, set in the 35th century (3424) on the Spacer planet Aurora
  6. Robots and Empire (1985) — fourth novel, set in the 37th century (3624) on Earth, Solaria, Aurora, and Baleyworld
5. Galactic Empire series
  1. The Stars, Like Dust (1951) — first novel, set in the 49th century (4850), thousands of years in the future before the founding of a Galactic Empire
  2. The Currents of Space (1952) — second novel, set in the 112th century (11129), set thousands of years in the future during Trantor's unification of the galaxy into a Galactic Empire
  3. Pebble in the Sky (1950) — third novel, set in the 125th century (12411), primarily set thousands of years in the future on Earth, when the galaxy is unified into a Galactic Empire
  4. "Blind Alley" (1945) — short story, set in the 126th century (12561–12562)
6. Foundation series
  1. Prelude to Foundation (1988) — first novel, set in the 237th century (23604)
  2. Forward the Foundation (1993) — second novel, set in the 237th century (23612–23653)
  3. Foundation (1951) — third novel, set from the 237th to 239th centuries (23651–23812)
  4. Foundation and Empire (1952) — fourth novel, set from the 239th to 240th centuries (23847–23963)
  5. Second Foundation (1953) — fifth novel, set from the 240th to 241st centuries (23968–24029)
  6. Foundation's Edge (1982) — sixth novel, set in the 242nd century (24150)
  7. Foundation and Earth (1986) — seventh novel, set in the 242nd century (24150)
7. The End of Eternity (1955) — a standalone novel, about Eternity, an organization "outside time" which aims to improve human happiness by altering history

=== Other authors contributing to the expanded series ===
Asimov's novels covered only 500 of the expected 1,000 years it would take for the Foundation to become a galactic empire. The novels that were written after Asimov did not continue the timeline but rather sought to fill in gaps in the earlier stories. The Foundation universe was once again revisited in 1989's Foundation's Friends, a collection of short stories written by many prominent science fiction authors of that time. Orson Scott Card's "The Originist" clarifies the founding of the Second Foundation shortly after Seldon's death; Harry Turtledove's "Trantor Falls" tells of the efforts by the Second Foundation to survive during the sacking of Trantor, the imperial capital and Second Foundation's home; and George Zebrowski's "Foundation's Conscience" is about the efforts of a historian to document Seldon's work following the rise of the Second Galactic Empire.

Also, shortly before his death in 1992, Asimov approved an outline for three novels by Roger MacBride Allen, known as the Caliban trilogy, set between Robots and Empire and the Empire series. The Caliban trilogy describes the terraforming of the Spacer world Inferno, a planet where an ecological crisis forces the Spacers to abandon many long-cherished parts of their culture. Allen's novels echo the uncertainties that Asimov's later books express about the Three Laws of Robotics, and in particular the way a thoroughly roboticized culture can degrade human initiative.

After Asimov's death and at the request of Janet Asimov and the Asimov estate's representative, Ralph Vicinanza approached Gregory Benford and asked him to write another Foundation story. He eventually agreed, and with Vicinanza and after speaking "to several authors about [the] project", formed a plan for a trilogy with "two hard SF writers broadly influenced by Asimov and of unchallenged technical ability: Greg Bear and David Brin." Foundation's Fear (1997) takes place chronologically between part one and part two of Asimov's second prequel novel, Forward the Foundation; Foundation and Chaos (1998) is set at the same time as the first chapter of Foundation, filling in the background; Foundation's Triumph (1999) covers ground following the recording of the holographic messages to the Foundation, and ties together a number of loose ends. These books are now claimed by some to collectively be a "Second Foundation trilogy", although they are inserts into pre-existing prequels and some of the earlier Foundation storylines and not generally recognized as a new Trilogy.

In an epilogue to Foundation's Triumph, Brin noted he could imagine himself or a different author writing another sequel to add to Foundation's Triumph, feeling that Hari Seldon's story was not yet necessarily finished. He later published a possible start of such a book on his website.

More recently, the Asimov estate authorized the publication of another trilogy of robot mysteries by Mark W. Tiedemann. These novels, which take place several years before Asimov's Robots and Empire, are Mirage (2000), Chimera (2001), and Aurora (2002). These were followed by yet another robot mystery, Alexander C. Irvine's Have Robot, Will Travel (2004), set five years after the Tiedemann trilogy.

In 2001, Donald Kingsbury published the novel Psychohistorical Crisis, set in the Foundation universe after the start of the Second Empire.

Novels by various authors (Isaac Asimov's Robot City, Robots and Aliens and Robots in Time series) are loosely connected to the Robot series, but contain many inconsistencies with Asimov's books, and are not generally considered part of the Foundation series.

In November 2009, the Asimov estate announced the publication of a prequel to I, Robot under the working title Robots and Chaos, the first volume in a prequel trilogy featuring Susan Calvin by fantasy author Mickey Zucker Reichert. The first book was published in November 2011 under the title I, Robot: To Protect, followed by I, Robot: To Obey in 2013 and I, Robot: To Preserve in 2016.

=== Stories set in the Foundation universe, including works by other authors ===
The following works are listed in chronological order by narrative:

C	Year	Title	Notes
	2011	I, Robot: To Protect	New prequel I, Robot trilogy by Mickey Zucker Reichert
	2013	I, Robot: To Obey	New prequel I, Robot trilogy by Mickey Zucker Reichert
	2016	I, Robot: To Preserve	New prequel I, Robot trilogy by Mickey Zucker Reichert
1	1950	I, Robot	The first collection of Robot short stories, all of which were included in The Complete Robot, except for the binding text, which is absent from The Complete Robot.
	1964	The Rest of the Robots	Includes 8 Robot short stories that were not in I, Robot, as well as the novels The Caves of Steel and The Naked Sun
	1982	The Complete Robot	Omnibus of I, Robot and The Rest of the Robots, although not including the binding text from I, Robot or the novels The Caves of Steel and The Naked Sun from The Rest of the Robots
	1986	Robot Dreams	Includes "Robot Dreams" and other short stories.
	1990	Robot Visions	Includes "Robot Visions," "Too Bad," "Christmas Without Rodney," and other short stories and essays.
	1995	Gold	A collection of short stories and essays, including robot short stories "Cal" and "Kid Brother".
	1993	Predator	First book of Isaac Asimov's Robots in Time series by author William F. Wu
	1993	Marauder	Second book of Isaac Asimov's Robots in Time series by author William F. Wu
	1993	Warrior	Third book of Isaac Asimov's Robots in Time series by author William F. Wu
	1994	Dictator	Fourth book of Isaac Asimov's Robots in Time series by author William F. Wu
	1994	Emperor	Fifth book of Isaac Asimov's Robots in Time series by author William F. Wu
	1994	Invader	Sixth book of Isaac Asimov's Robots in Time series by author William F. Wu
2	1992	The Positronic Man	Robot novel based on Asimov's short story "The Bicentennial Man", written by Robert Silverberg
3	1989	Nemesis	The novel is set in an era in which interstellar travel is in the process of being discovered and perfected.
	1948	"Mother Earth"	Short story set between the early Earth era and the era of the Robot novels, at a time when the Spacer worlds were first being colonised. Contains some minor inconsistencies with later stories. Published in The Early Asimov, or Eleven Years of Trying
4	1954	The Caves of Steel	The first Robot novel. It is contained in The Rest of the Robots, although not in The Complete Robot.
5	1957	The Naked Sun	The second Robot novel. It is contained in The Rest of the Robots, although not in The Complete Robot.
	1972	"Mirror Image"	Written after having received numerous requests to continue the story of detective Elijah Baley and his robot partner R. Daneel Olivaw, featured in his earlier novels The Caves of Steel and The Naked Sun. Published in The Complete Robot and later in Robot Visions.
6	1983	The Robots of Dawn	The third Robot novel. Hugo Award nominee, 1984 Locus Award nominee, 1984
	1987	Odyssey	First book of Isaac Asimov's Robot City series by Michael P. Kube-McDowell
	1987	Suspicion	Second book of Isaac Asimov's Robot City series by Mike McQuay
	1987	Cyborg	Third book of Isaac Asimov's Robot City series by William F. Wu
	1988	Prodigy	Fourth book of Isaac Asimov's Robot City series by Arthur Byron Cover
	1988	Refuge	Fifth book of Isaac Asimov's Robot City series by Rob Chilson
	1988	Perihelion	Sixth book of Isaac Asimov's Robot City series by William F. Wu
	1989	Changeling	First book of Isaac Asimov's Robots and Aliens series by Stephen Leigh
	1989	Renegade	Second book of Isaac Asimov's Robots and Aliens series by Cordell Scotten
	1990	Intruder	Third book of Isaac Asimov's Robots and Aliens series by Robert Thurston
	1990	Alliance	Fourth book of Isaac Asimov's Robots and Aliens series by Jerry Oltion
	1990	Maverick	Fifth book of Isaac Asimov's Robots and Aliens series by Bruce Bethke
	1990	Humanity	Sixth book of Isaac Asimov's Robots and Aliens series by Jerry Oltion
	2000	Mirage	First book of the Robot Mystery series by Mark W. Tiedemann.
	2001	Chimera	Second book of the Robot Mystery series by Mark W. Tiedemann.
	2002	Aurora	Third book of the Robot Mystery series by Mark W. Tiedemann.
	2005	Have Robot, Will Travel	Fourth book of the Robot Mystery series; written by Alexander C. Irvine.
7	1985	Robots and Empire	The fourth Robot novel. Locus Award nominee, 1986
	1993	Isaac Asimov's Caliban	Caliban trilogy by Roger MacBride Allen.
	1994	Isaac Asimov's Inferno	Caliban trilogy by Roger MacBride Allen.
	1996	Isaac Asimov's Utopia	Caliban trilogy by Roger MacBride Allen.
8	1951	The Stars, Like Dust	The first Empire novel.
9	1952	The Currents of Space	The second Empire novel.
10	1950	Pebble in the Sky	The third Empire novel; however, it was Asimov's first full novel to be published.
	1945	"Blind Alley"	Short story set in the Foundation universe. Published in the March/1945 issue of Astounding Science Fiction, and later included in the collection The Early Asimov (1972).
11	1988	Prelude to Foundation	This is the first Foundation novel. Locus Award nominee, 1989
12 (Note: The final section of Forward the Foundation, "Epilogue", appears to directly precede Hari Seldon's death. Therefore, at least this part of the book would be located after the events of Foundation and Chaos, Foundation's Triumph and the first chapter of Foundation.)	1993	Forward the Foundation	The second Foundation novel (although it was the last written by Asimov himself).
	1997	Foundation's Fear	The first book of the Second Foundation trilogy by Gregory Benford.
	1998	Foundation and Chaos	The second book of the Second Foundation trilogy by Greg Bear.
	1999	Foundation's Triumph	The third book of the Second Foundation trilogy by David Brin.
13	1951	Foundation	The third Foundation novel. Actually, it is a collection of four stories, originally published between 1942 and 1944, plus an introductory section written for the book in 1949. Published, slightly abridged, as part of an Ace Double paperback, D-110, with the title The 1000-Year Plan, in 1955.
14	1952	Foundation and Empire	The fourth Foundation novel, made up of two stories originally published in 1945. Published with the title The Man Who Upset the Universe as a 35c Ace paperback, D-125, in about 1952.
15	1953	Second Foundation	The fifth Foundation novel, made up of two stories, originally published in 1948 and 1949.
16	1982	Foundation's Edge	The sixth Foundation novel. Nebula Award nominee, 1982; Hugo Award winner, 1983; Locus Award winner, 1983
17	1986	Foundation and Earth	The seventh Foundation novel. Locus Award nominee, 1987
	1989	Foundation's Friends	Foundation's Friends, Stories in Honor of Isaac Asimov is a 1989 anthology of short stories set in the timeline of the greater Foundation series. It was edited by Martin H. Greenberg, with contributing authors including Ray Bradbury, Robert Silverberg, Frederik Pohl, Poul Anderson, Harry Turtledove, and Orson Scott Card.
	2001	Psychohistorical Crisis	Psychohistorical Crisis is a science fiction novel by Donald Kingsbury. An expansion of his 1995 novella "Historical Crisis", it is a re-imagining of the world of Isaac Asimov's Foundation series, set after the establishment of the Second Empire.
18	1955	The End of Eternity	Members of the time-changing organization Eternity seek to ensure that their own organization is founded as history says it was, by ensuring the conditions for that event happen as history says they happened. Asimov tied this novel into his broader Foundation Series, by suggesting in Foundation's Edge that it is set in a universe where Eternity had existed but was destroyed by Eternals, resulting in an all-human galaxy.

== Technology ==
=== Psychohistory ===
In the novel Foundation (1951), mathematician and psychologist Hari Seldon has created a new mathematical field known as psychohistory. This uses statistics and social sciences to predict the actions of large groups of people over long periods of time, in this way predicting future trends on a galactic scale. He has predicted the unavoidable and relatively imminent fall of the Galactic Empire, and aims to create a new institute called the Foundation, "a repository of crucial, civilization-preserving knowledge" that will enable society to speed up the recovery of civilization after that fall. The Seldon Plan is Seldon's great work intended to achieve this goal, a huge work of mathematics that describes the pattern of events set in motion by Seldon's intervention itself, and those of his successors; a plan that centers on the Foundation, but is far from Seldon's ostensible goal of setting up a repository of knowledge.

The Time Vault, created and programmed by Seldon, is designed to open "at defining moments in galactic history", known as "Seldon Crises", and impart crucial knowledge through holographically recorded messages from Seldon, confirming the course of the plan.

The Prime Radiant, a device designed by Seldon, stores psychohistorical equations showing the future development of humanity. The Prime Radiant projects the equations onto walls in some unexplained manner, but it does not cast shadows, thus allowing workers easy interaction. As a tool of the Second Foundation, control operates through the power of the mind, allowing the user to zoom in to details of the equations, and to change them. The plan is described in Foundation's Edge as containing acres of equations, starting with Seldon's own work and extended in color-coded addenda by Seldon's successors.

=== Other ===
A Visi-Sonor is a multi-keyed musical instrument that produces holographic visual effects as well as music. By incorporating his own mental ability to manipulate emotions, The Mule is able to use the instrument to brainwash others in Foundation and Empire (1952).

The Mind static device is introduced in Second Foundation. It is a tool developed by a group within the Foundation for use against the members of the Second Foundation, using their mentalic powers against them.

=== TV series technologies ===
The 2021 Apple TV+ television series adaptation Foundation deviates substantially from Asimov's source work, and includes technological elements not featured by Asimov in the novels. Though cloning does not factor in Asimov's novels, the television series introduces a "Genetic Dynasty", surreptitiously administered for centuries by the regal Lady Demerzel, an expanded and gender-swapped version of the character from Prelude to Foundation and its sequel, Forward the Foundation (1993). In the series, the 12,000-year-old Empire is ruled by a revolving trio of Cleon I clones: Brother Day, a Cleon in his prime; Brother Dawn, a young Cleon being trained to succeed Brother Day; and Brother Dusk, a retired and aging Cleon who serves in an advisory role.

In the television series, an aura is depicted as a protective force shield technology forbidden to everyone except the Emperors, but in season two it is revealed that the Foundation also possesses the technology and has distributed it to their envoys. Jumpships are starships capable of faster-than-light travel, operated by Spacers, genetically engineered and cybernetically enhanced humans made capable of remaining conscious and functional during jumps. Though jump technology is initially possessed only by the Empire, the Foundation is able to reverse-engineer their own version using the captured warship Invictus. Called whisper-ships, these starships are able to jump without requiring a Spacer to navigate. In the series, The Vault has been sent to Terminus ahead of the colonists who establish the Foundation. The object, which hovers above the ground, is surrounded by a "null field" that disorients humans, preventing anyone from approaching until the Vault itself allows them to. The exception is Salvor Hardin, the Warden and protector of Terminus, who possesses an inexplicable immunity to the field. The Star Bridge is a massive structure on Trantor that serves as a space elevator connecting the surface of the planet to a starship platform in geosynchronous orbit. Known as the "tether" or the "stalk", transit from the platform to the surface of the planet takes 14 hours. When the Star Bridge is severed by a terrorist attack in "The Emperor's Peace", the bulk of it crashes to the surface and kills 100 million citizens. Trader and con man Hober Mallow possesses a castling device which allows two people of similar mass to switch places via a form of teleportation. Imperial General Bel Riose uses it to switch places with the Emperor clone Brother Day in the season two finale "Creation Myths", resulting in Day being vented into space and killed.

== Planetary systems, stars and planets ==
Asimov notes in "The Psychohistorians" that there are "nearly twenty-five million inhabited planets in the Galaxy".

61 Cygni
A star system advanced by Lord Dorwin as the potential site for a planet of origin for the human species. Lord Dorwin cites 'Sol' (meaning Earth's Sun) and three other planetary systems in the Sirius Sector, along with Arcturus in the Arcturus Sector, as potential original worlds. Claims were made as early as 1942 that 61 Cygni had a planetary system, though, to date, none have been verified.
Achilles
A gas giant planet in the Anacreon system. Its size is somewhere between Saturn and Neptune, about 1.7 times as dense as water, with a strong equatorial bulge. In appearance, it is a dark, yellow-biased red, with scattered orange patches indicating storm systems. Achilles has several moons, such as one within the orbit of Neoptolemus, four between that and Ulysses, and twenty outside of Ulysses; all of these others are captured asteroids.
Alpha
It orbits the star Alpha Centauri A, only 4.2 light-years from Sol (our Sun). The Empire terraformed this planet to hold Earth's inhabitants after it was devastated by radiation, but the project was never completed. Covered almost entirely with water, save for a fifteen-thousand-square-kilometer island, this planet was considered by Lord Dorwin to be the original system of humanity. The inhabitants call it New Earth and live a simple lifestyle that of women and men are completely shirtless, weather permitting, and the men engage in long sea voyages to fish. About halfway into the thousand-year darkness after the fall of the Empire, Golan Trevize ventured to this planet in his search for Earth. The inhabitants seemed nice enough but tried to infect him and his crew with a disease. After leaving, Trevize headed to the Solar System.
Anacreon (also known as Anacreon A II)
A planet near the outer end of the periphery. As part of the Galactic Empire was the capital of Anacreon subprefecture, Anacreon prefecture, and Anacreon Province, and later the Anacreon Kingdom. Anacreon is a binary star system. The pair orbit at 73.8 AU with a period of, in Earth terms, 181 years, 84 days and 14 hours.
Arcturus
One of the major planets. It is the capital world of the Sirius Sector in the Galactic Empire. It seems to have been named for the star Arcturus in Boötes.
Aurora
Originally named New Earth, in later millennia the planet would be renamed "Aurora", which means "dawn", to signify the dawning of a new age for the Spacer culture. It is an Earthlike planet, the innermost planet orbiting the star Tau Ceti (12 ly from Sol). It was the first Spacer planet colonized, established in 2065. Its capital is Eon (about 20,000 inhabitants). As it was highly populated and developed, it was considered the "capital" of the Spacers. The planet has two moons: Tithonus I and Tithonus II. Aurora at its height had a population of 200 million humans, and 10 billion robots. The head of its planetary government was called the "Chairman". The largest city on the planet was Eos (which means also "dawn"), the administrative and robotic centre of Aurora, where Han Fastolfe and Gladia Solaria lived. The University of Eos and the Auroran Robotics Institute were both located within Eos. After the decline of the Spacers, the planet's remaining inhabitants are believed to have emigrated to Trantor, settling in the Mycogen Sector. The descendants of the Aurorans, or Mycogenians, never forgot Aurora, but they apparently evolved to the point where they were indistinguishable from Settlers. The scripture of the Mycogenians mentions Aurora, robots, and other topics; Hari Seldon peruses this document and finds the "corpse" of a robot in Mycogen also. Ironically, the culture of Mycogen appears to be in many ways a complete opposite of Aurora. Where the society of Aurora had complete gender equality and social mobility, Mycogen has a restrictive caste system with women apparently taking the place of Auroran robots, with absolutely no rights. It is also very restrictive sexually, where Aurora was basically a free love society. Mycogen, a sector of Trantor, identifies Aurora as the first planet and gives a high value to the Robots, lamenting his loss. The searchers for Earth visit Aurora, along with other ancient settlements. The planet is by then not inhabited by human beings, and its desertified ecology is dominated by feral dogs.
Comporellon (originally Baleyworld)
A planet located near Gaia and Sayshell, Comporellon was renowned for its particularly old age. It was founded by the second wave of space colonists, known as the Settlers, and thus had a very superstitious attitude toward the first wave, the Spacers. They were also superstitious about Earth. Golan Trevize, Janov Pelorat, and Bliss visit Comporellon in Foundation and Earth, and acquire the coordinates of three Spacer worlds: Solaria, Aurora, and Melpomenia from a historian. Comporellon was under the political influence of the First Foundation, but its awkward situation caused resentment toward Foundationers. Its inhabitants preferred clothes that were white, gray, and black. Trevize comments that their food could be very good. Astronomically, Comporellon was a very cold ice world.
Earth (sometimes called Old Earth, Gaia or Terra)
A planet, the most common setting of his robot short stories. Earth is the planet upon which humans have lived for longer than anyone remembers. Earth features in one of several Origin Myths found throughout the Galactic Empire. Still, its history is shrouded in the mists of time. Earth was the third planet from its sun (called Sol) and had one large moon (Luna). From millions of years BC to the early Galactic Era, Earth was one of the most, if not the most, important planets in the galaxy, being one of the only planets to ever develop life without being colonized by other worlds, and being the origin planet of the human race, who would go on to dominate the galaxy through the Galactic Empire. Around 65,000,000 BC, the dinosaurs, the original dominant race of Earth, were killed by a race of small intelligent lizards armed with guns, which either left Earth or died out. Eventually, humans evolved on the planet. Up until the 20th century AD, the human race progressed, having wars and developing technology, experiencing the ups and downs of civilization, but nothing extremely radical happened, and, most importantly, no one made an attempt to leave Earth and colonize new worlds. In the early 20th century, two world wars were endured, WW1 in the 1910s and WW2 in the 1940s. Eventually, in 1973, the human race reached for the moon. The Prometheus failed, but, after some complicated series of events, the New Prometheus reached the moon in 1978, achieving the goal of leaving Earth, if only slightly. From around 1979 to 1982, WW3 took place, ending nationalism, and splitting Earth into Regions. From there, the planet experienced a new renaissance, developing positronic brains in the 1980s and 1990s, governed by the Three Laws of Robotics. One of the most important early pioneers in robotics was Susan Calvin (1982-2064), who was the first and chief robopsychologist at US Robots and Mechanical Men from 2007 to 2058. Robots eventually grew very advanced. In 2065, Earth colonized the first extrasolar world, Aurora, the World of the Dawn. This was the first of the great Spacer Worlds, which were colonized over thousands of years across the stars. Around 3720, they rebelled against Earth, winning the Three-Week War, and would become higher in society than Earth. In 4724, detective Elijah Baley managed to allow the colonization of new worlds by Earth, which had been suppressed, and the Settler worlds were made. These were threatened in 4922 but were saved due to the efforts of Gladia Solaria, R. Daneel Olivaw and R. Giskard Reventlov, at the cost of Earth being made radioactive by Levular Mandamus. Eventually, the Settler worlds spread across the galaxy, outnumbering the Spacer worlds greatly, and Earth sank into unimportance, but was still known of and not looked down on. 1,000 years into the radioactivity, it was believed to be the result of a nuclear war. Thousands of years later, in the year 500 of the Foundation Era, Daneel Olivaw was on the Moon of Earth and encountered Golan Trevize.
Fomalhaut
A star mentioned in novel Pebble in the Sky. Joseph Schwartz of Chicago is transported by a stray beam of radiation to the Earth of the far future, which is part of a galactic empire ruled by the planet Trantor. Finding himself in wild countryside, he searches far and wide for help until he stumbles upon a cottage — only he can't understand the dwellers, nor they, him. One of them theorizes, "He must come from some far-off corner of the Galaxy ... They say the men of Fomalhaut have to learn practically a new language to be understood at the Emperor's court on Trantor." Asimov would later substantially abandon using any real star names at all in the empire.
Gaia
Whose people are known by the same name or the Anti-Mules, is a planet described in the novel Foundation's Edge and referred to in Foundation and Earth. The name is derived from the Gaia hypothesis, which is itself eponymous to Gaia, the Earth goddess. Gaia is located in the Sayshell Sector, about ten parsecs (32 light-years) from the system Sayshell itself. It orbits a G-4 class star and has one natural satellite (50 km or 31 miles in diameter). Its axial inclination is 12°, and a Gaian day lasts 0.92 Galactic Standard Days. In its course of settlement, the human beings on Gaia, under robotic guidance, not only evolved their ability to form an ongoing group consciousness but also extended this consciousness to the fauna and flora of the planet itself, even including inanimate matter. As a result, the entire planet became a super-organism. Gaia was founded by R. Daneel Olivaw during the Empire's reign. Even then, the galaxy left it alone and it evaded taxes. By 498 F.E., Gaia had a population of one billion, a high population for a planet at that time. The inhabitants hoped eventually to create a complex ecology; all human-settled planets in the Galaxy —except Earth— had simple ecologies. The inhabitants of Gaia were all tied together into a telepathic group consciousness when it was founded; this consciousness was eventually extended to the non-human life, and later to the inorganic material of the planet. This would explain the Mule's incredible psychic powers, as Gaia was said to be his home planet.
Gamma Andromeda
A star system mentioned in the novel Foundation. A catastrophic nuclear reactor meltdown occurred on Gamma Andromeda V in the year 50 F.E. The meltdown killed several million people and destroyed at least half the planet.
Jennisek
A planet in close vicinity of Helicon, its traditional rival. This planet was described by Hari Seldon in Prelude to Foundation.
Kalgan
A planet located in the Periphery, Kalgan was a world of no particular resource or strategic value which rose to prominence during the reign of the Galactic Empire as a pleasure planet. Imperial nobles would visit Kalgan as a means to indulge themselves, making the planet and its leadership immensely prosperous. Because of its ability to stay neutral from conflict and to provide tourism as its main amenity, Kalgan survived the decline of the Empire with ease and eventually came under the control of a warlord. In 310 F.E., the Mule, as chronicled in Foundation and Empire, took over Kalgan by converting its warlord into his mind-slave. For a brief time, over a third of the Galaxy was ruled from Kalgan through the Mule's Union of Worlds, but after his death, the Lords of Kalgan were unable to maintain this level of control. The Union disintegrated into a mere 27 worlds and was almost completely encapsulated by the economic and political control of the Foundation. In 376 F.E., Lord Stettin, urged by his own egomania, decided to invade the Foundation. For a brief time, the power of Kalgan was extended, before the morale boost of the Seldon Plan caught up to Kalganians fighting on the front. Demoralized, they were easily overcome by the brilliant technical maneuvers of the Foundationer Navy. The peace deals following the Stettinian War made the subject worlds of Kalgan autonomous and, through popular vote, they were permitted to become independent or to join the Foundation Federation. After this crushing defeat, Kalgan ceased to play a major role in galactic history.
Korell
A planet in the novel Foundation. Located in the Whassalian Rift, it was the capital of the Republic of Korell. Korell was one of those frequent phenomena of a republic only in name. The dictator, called the Commdor 'first citizen of the state', is elected every year. Through some twist or another, a member of the Argo family is always chosen. According to Hober Mallow, people who didn't like this arrangement had "things" happen to them. Unlike a de jure monarch, the de facto monarchy associated with the status of the Commdor was not moderated by the typical influences of "honour" and "court etiquette". Korell was the third Seldon Crisis because it was the first nation encountered by the Foundation with an effective system of nucleics. Hober Mallow was sent to investigate. Mallow visited Asper Argo, Commdor of Korell, and opened up trade with his people through him. Despite discovering the steel foundries were not nuclear, Mallow did spot nuclear blasters provided by the Galactic Empire. Otherwise, Korell was decadent. The only remains of the Empire were 'silent memorials' and 'broken buildings'; the navy consisted of 'tiny, limping relics' and 'battered, clumsy hulks'. Mallow later learned that the viceroy of the Normannic Sector was providing Korell with nuclear blasters and with ships (five by the time Korell declared war with the Foundation; a sixth was promised). Mallow quickly realised that the real enemy was the Empire, not Korell; forcing himself into the office of mayor, Mallow was able to destroy the threat of Korell by doing nothing. Since his visit three years before had made Korell dependent on Foundation-made goods, the Korellians raised a good deal of complaints about their minor inconveniences. Since there was no threat of foreign conquest, the people became rebellious. Faced with this situation, the Commdor was forced to surrender to the Foundation unconditionally. The planets of the Korellian Republic eventually entered the Foundation's hands. They were captured briefly by Kalgan during the early stages of the war with Kalgan.
Melpomenia
A planet in the novel Foundation and Earth and it was one of the fifty Spacer worlds, colonized by the first wave of settlers from Earth. It was nineteenth in the order of settlement. In their search for the planet of origin of the human species, the third set of coordinates given to Golan Trevize, Janov Pelorat, and Bliss points to Melpomenia, an old, dead Spacer world with a very thin atmosphere and almost no signs of civilization except for some old ruins. One of these ruins was found to be the "Hall of the Worlds", within which was a wall inscribed with the names, coordinates, and dates of the settlement of all the fifty Spacer worlds in chronological order. This information is later used by Janov Pelorat to deduce the approximate position of Earth in the galaxy. The first try led Pelorat not to Earth but to the nearby planet Alpha (in the system of Alpha Centauri, approximately four light-years away from Earth). In addition, they also happen to find that even in this harsh, nearly air-less world, life does manage to survive in the form of a kind of moss that lives on the faintest traces of carbon dioxide. The moss starts to grow along the edges of the face-plates of their spacesuits, and Trevize realizes that if it were to somehow get within their ship, the Far Star, it would become impossible to control. It would follow the trail of carbon dioxide along their nostrils and into their lungs and kill them. Using his blaster on minimum power, he burns away the moss on their spacesuits and also along the Far Star's airlock so that they can get inside safely.
Neotrantor (originally named Delicass)
Was a small agricultural planet located near the center of the galaxy, near Trantor. After the Great Sack, it was the location of the last seat of the Galactic Empire. Dagobert IX short reign stemmed from Neotrantor. In Foundation and Empire, Toran and Bayta Darell, Ebling Mis, and the Mule visit Neotrantor during their search for the Second Foundation. They are given permission by Dagobert IX to enter the Imperial Library on Trantor but are stopped by Dagobert X, who wishes to marry Bayta. After the Mule kills the crown prince, the group leaves the disenfranchised Neotrantor.
Nishaya
A planet mentioned in the novel Forward the Foundation. Part of the pre-Imperial Kingdom of Trantor. At the end of the Empire, the planet was noted for its goat herding and high-quality cheeses. Laskin Joranum pretended to be from Nishaya during his campaign to overthrow Eto Demerzel. His identity was compromised when Hari Seldon noted that he had a perfect fluency of the Trantorian dialect and was opposed to native Nishayans who spoke a very different dialect of Galactic standard.
Santanni
A planet 9000 parsecs (29,000 light-years) from Trantor and 800 parsecs (2600 light-years) from Locris. In 12,058 G.E. the population of Santanni attempted to rebel against the Galactic Empire. Raych Seldon, son of psychohistorian Hari Seldon, was killed in the rebellion, valiantly defending the University of Santanni. After the founding of the Foundation, Santanni traded with it until the trade route was cut off by the rebellion of Anacreon. One known thing of Santanni make was the cigar box possessed by Jord Fara, and later by Salvor Hardin. It was captured in the early stages of the war with Kalgan. After the death of the Mule, Santanni was instrumental in breaking the siege on Terminus levied by the Mule's successor, Han Pritcher in 308 F.E.
Sayshell
Was a planet in the Periphery. It was the capital of the Sayshell Union, which was renowned for having resisted the control of the Foundation Federation for several hundred years during the Interregnum, despite being completely surrounded by Federation territory. Sayshell features heavily in Foundation's Edge. According to the legends of Sayshell, the planet was founded by a group of colonists who were not known to hail from any other colonized world, leading some historians, such as Janov Pelorat, to conclude that Sayshell was a colony founded directly from Earth. The Sayshellians themselves believed (incorrectly) that Earth was located somewhere within Sayshell Sector. Due to the protection of the mentalic planet Gaia, Sayshell was never truly threatened by outside forces for all of its history. Under the Galactic Empire, Sayshell received minimal taxation and enjoyed a large degree of independence from Imperial controls. Later, after the fall of the Empire, Sayshell remained untouched by the anarchic war which consumed most of the Galaxy and eventually from the control of the Mule's Union of Worlds and the Foundation Federation. Sayshell was briefly threatened by the Foundation Federation under Harla Branno, who in reality wished to destroy the planet Gaia (which lay completely within Sayshellian territory). Gaia used her mentalic influence to convince the Sayshellians that, in the end, Mayor Branno was looking for a neutrality-trade treaty, marking the end of Sayshell's brief stint in galactic affairs. Sayshellian culture was noticeably different from that of the ultra-scientific Foundation Federation. It stressed mysticism (especially the influence of dreams) and the respect of nature, as evidenced by the percentage of Sayshellian wildlife that was still preserved from human influence. Sayshellians also had excellent cuisine, and a minor dislike toward outsiders, especially Foundationers. The religion and philosophy of Sayshell seem to be modeled on Buddhism.
Siwenna (Note: Consistent with the Roman Empire-Galactic Empire parallelism of the Foundation trilogy, the planet's name may be intended to evoke Ravenna, the city which was the seat of Byzantine hegemony in Italy in the 5th century B.C.)
A planet prominent in Foundation and Foundation and Empire. It was the capital of the Normannic Sector of the Galactic Empire, and once one of its richest planets. Shortly after 100 F.E., Wiscard, the viceroy of Siwenna, rebelled. Most of the subjects remained loyal to the Empire and overthrew Wiscard, led by Patrician Onum Barr. The Imperial Admiral dispatched to Siwenna was angered at this, because it robbed him of his glory. So, he put most of the population of Siwenna under the atom blast, charging them with the crime of rebelling against an Imperial viceroy (Wiscard). Much of its population was killed, and Barr himself lost five sons and a daughter; only his sixth son, Ducem Barr, survived. Because of the rampant destruction of Siwenna, the Admiral set himself up as viceroy but moved the capital of the Normannic Sector to Orsha II. Between this time and its conquest by Bel Riose in 200 F.E., Siwenna rebelled five times, eventually becoming independent. When the campaign led by Riose against the Foundation ended, the Siwenna province transferred to the Foundation, the first Imperial province to pass directly from the Empire to the Foundation. After the beginning of the Foundation Era, Siwenna began to run downhill. 'The physical resources of twenty-five first rank planets take a long time to use up. Compared to the wealth of the last century, though, we have gone a long way downhill—and there is no sign of turning, not yet,' –Onum Barr, to Hober Mallow, 150 F.E. About 50 years before, Stanel VI died, ending a reign under which Siwenna came close to achieving its ancient prosperity. Little is known of Siwennian culture, except that when Riose first met Ducem Barr, it was 'socially impossible not to drink tea on Siwenna'.
Smyrno
A planet located in the Anacreon Province. It is originally a prefect but later becomes one of the Four Kingdoms in the Anacreon Province that broke away from the Galactic Empire c. 50 F.E. The kingdom of Smyrno has no nuclear power until the Foundation arrives. The planet itself is located a little less than 50 parsecs (163 light-years) from Terminus. Its name is a parallel with Smyrna, an important city of the Roman Empire in Anatolia. Smyrno is hot and dry, the rooms smell of sulphur, and people live underground. Its most famous citizen is Hober Mallow, one of the major characters from the Foundation series. Its citizens are often discriminated against by Foundation members. Smyrnians are often seen as unintelligent and untrustworthy. Jorane Sutt, a political enemy to Mallow (who eventually becomes mayor), uses Mallow's ethnicity against him.
Solaria
A planet in Robot and Foundation series. Inhabited by Spacer descendants, Solaria is the fiftieth and last Spacer world settled in the first wave of interstellar settlement. It was occupied from approximately 4627 AD by inhabitants of the neighboring world Nexon, originally for summer homes. It was ruled by a Regent after it became independent around roughly 4727 AD. It had perhaps the most eccentric culture of all of them. The Solarians specialized in the construction of robots, which they exported to the other Spacer Worlds. Solarian robots were noted for their variety and excellence. They also exported their grain, which was used to make a pastry known as the pachinka. Originally, there were about 20,000 people living in vast estates individually or as married couples. There were thousands of robots for every Solarian. Almost all of the work and manufacturing was conducted by robots. The population was kept stable through strict birth and immigration controls. In the era of Robots and Empire, no more than five thousand Solarians were known to remain. Twenty thousand years later, the population was twelve hundred, with just one human per estate. Solarians hated physical contact with others and only communicated with each other via holograms. A few hundred years after Elijah Baley's visit to the planet, Solarians retreated from the Galactic scene and fled underground. The Solarians genetically altered themselves to be hermaphroditic and have the ability to use telekinesis. They specially made robots that were made to kill any foreigners who came to the planet. In 499 F.E. (approximately 25,066 AD), Solaria was visited by Golan Trevize, Janov Pelorat, and Bliss. They landed on the estate of Sarton Bander, the "Ruler" of a Solarian estate (note that Sarton was the last name of R. Daneel Olivaw's designer, Roj Nemennuh Sarton of Aurora). They learned of the sociological developments of Solaria through Bander, who apparently took a secret pleasure in having something close to intellectual companionship, or at least an intellectual audience. To prevent them from providing information to the Galaxy about Solaria and in keeping with Solarian customs and beliefs, not to mention preventing other Solarians' discovery of shameful personal contact with offworlders, Bander attempted to kill the visitors but was instead killed in self-defense by Bliss, resulting in the shutdown of all of the robots and other machinery of the Bander Estate. The visitors were able to escape, but not before discovering a child in one of the countless rooms of the estate, Fallom, assuming it to be a successor to Bander (who had not mentioned the existence of an heir, but had mentioned that there would be one at the appropriate time or in the case of an unforeseen accident), whom they would ultimately bring with them to Earth. Had they left Fallom on Solaria, the child would almost certainly have been killed, because it was seen as a surplus child and also had not as yet developed its transducer lobes, therefore not counting as a Solarian and being expendable. Fallom demonstrated great precocity in learning Galactic and would eventually stay on the Moon of Earth to mentally merge with Daneel Olivaw.
Synnax
A planet mentioned in novel Foundation. Synnax circles a star at the edges of the Blue Drift. Its inhabitants are considered "provincial" by the more urbanite Trantorians. It was the homeworld of the psychohistorian Gaal Dornick. It is mentioned in the first book that despite its "provincial" nature, it had not been kept away from civilization. Imperial coronations have been broadcast properly in the world. Synnax has only one satellite.
Tazenda
A star system visited by Bail Channis, under the orders of The Mule, in search of the second Foundation.
Terminus
The capital planet of the First Foundation. It is located at the edge of the Galaxy. It was the sole planet orbiting its isolated star and had almost no metals. The nearest planet was Anacreon, 8 parsecs (26 light-years) away. Being on the fringe of the galaxy, there are almost no stars in the sky. It lay on the edge of the Galaxy that was opposite the planet Siwenna. It was the planet farthest from the Galactic Centre; its name reflects that fact: Latin terminus means 'end of the line'. It had a very high water-to-land ratio. The only large island was the one on which Terminus City lay. A total of ten thousand inhabited islands existed on the planet. The climate was mild. Prior to human occupation, there was some life on Terminus. Once humans arrived (along with their supporting species), these native life forms were crowded out and became extinct. The capital of Terminus Planet is Terminus City. Three other cities are known: Agyropol, Newton City, Stanmark (Arkady Darell's hometown).
Trantor
Central planet which serves as both the Imperial capital and the administrative center of the galaxy. It is also the planet where Streeling University is located. It is an illustration of what could eventually happen to any urbanized planet. Asimov used the Roman Empire as the creative basis for the galactic empire depicted in Asimov's Foundation and Empire series, with Trantor as Rome itself.

== Selected awards ==
In 1966, the Foundation trilogy beat several other science fiction and fantasy series to receive a special Hugo Award for "Best All-Time Series". The runners-up for the award were the Barsoom series by Edgar Rice Burroughs, the Future History series by Robert A. Heinlein, the Lensman series by Edward E. Smith and The Lord of the Rings by J. R. R. Tolkien. The Foundation series was the only series so honored until the establishment of the "Best Series" category in 2017. Asimov himself wrote that he assumed the one-time award had been created to honor The Lord of the Rings, and he was amazed when his work won.

The series has won five other Hugo Awards, one Nebula Award, and three Locus Awards. In addition, the Foundation trilogy was consistently high in the Locus polls of all-time best novels, climbing to be voted the 3rd best 20th century science fiction novel in the 2012 poll, behind only Frank Herbert's Dune and Orson Scott Card's Ender's Game. Despite Asimov's death in 1992, the series continues being highly regarded, with the last award received as recently as in 2023. The list of most notable awards and nominations can be found in the following table:

Year	Award	Category	Recipient	Result	Ref.
1956	1956 Hugo Awards	Best Novel	The End of Eternity	Nominated	
1966	1966 Hugo Awards	Best All-Time Series	The Foundation Trilogy	Won	
1973	1973 Locus Awards	Best Reprint Anthology/Collection	The Early Asimov (Note: The collection contains stories "Blind Alley", the only short story in the Galactic Empire series, and novella "Mother Earth".)	5	
1975	1975 Locus Awards	Best Novelette	"—That Thou Art Mindful of Him!"	3	
1975	1975 Hugo Awards	Best Novelette	"—That Thou Art Mindful of Him!"	Nominated	
1975	1975 Locus Poll	Best All-Time Novel	The Foundation Trilogy	6	
1975	1975 Locus Poll	Best All-Time Novel	The Caves of Steel	30	
1977	1976 Nebula Awards	Best Novelette	"The Bicentennial Man"	Won	
1977	1977 Hugo Awards	Best Novelette	"The Bicentennial Man"	Won	
1977	1977 Locus Awards	Best Novelette	"The Bicentennial Man"	Won	
1977	1977 Locus Awards	Best Author Collection	The Bicentennial Man and Other Stories	5	
1983	1982 Nebula Awards	Best Novel	Foundation's Edge	Nominated	
1983	1983 Hugo Awards	Best Novel	Foundation's Edge	Won	
1983	1983 Locus Awards	Best SF Novel	Foundation's Edge	Won	
1983	1983 Locus Awards	Best Single Author Collection	The Complete Robot	7	
1984	1984 Hugo Awards	Best Novel	The Robots of Dawn	Nominated	
1984	1984 Locus Awards	Best SF Novel	The Robots of Dawn	2	
1986	1986 Locus Awards	Best SF Novel	Robots and Empire	4	
1987	1986 Nebula Awards	Best Short Story	"Robot Dreams"	Nominated	
1987	1987 Hugo Awards	Best Short Story	"Robot Dreams"	Nominated	
1987	1987 Locus Awards	Best Short Story	"Robot Dreams"	Won	
1987	1987 Locus Awards	Best SF Novel	Foundation and Earth	5	
1987	1987 Locus Awards	Best Collecttion	Robot Dreams (Note: The nominated collection includes the separately nominated short story of the same title.)	8	
1987	1987 Locus Poll	Best All-Time SF Novel	The Foundation Trilogy	6	
1987	1987 Locus Poll	Best All-Time SF Novel	The Caves of Steel	33	
1989	1989 Locus Awards	Best SF Novel	Prelude to Foundation	4	
1990	1990 Locus Awards	Best Novella	"The Originist" (Note: The novella first appeared in the anthology Foundation's Friends, published in 1989 in honor of Isaac Asimov with his own afterword.) by Orson Scott Card	8	
1993	1993 Locus Awards	Best Novella	"Cleon the Emperor" (Note: The novella is a part of the 1993 Forward the Foundation excerpted for an earlier magazine publication in 1992.)	4	
1994	1994 Locus Awards	Best Collection	Forward the Foundation	5	
1995	1995 Locus Awards	Best Art Book	I, Robot: the Illustrated Screenplay by Harlan Ellison and Isaac Asimov	3	
1996	1946 Retro-Hugo Awards	Best Novella	"Dead Hand" (Note: The novella was originally published in 1945 and, retitled "The General", became the first part of the 1952 novel Foundation and Empire.)	Nominated	
1996	1946 Retro-Hugo Awards	Best Novel	"The Mule" (Note: The novel was originally published in 1945 and later became the second part of the 1952 novel Foundation and Empire.)	Won	
1998	1998 Locus Poll	Best All-Time SF Novel before 1990	The Foundation Trilogy	4	
2001	1951 Retro-Hugo Awards	Best Novel	Pebble in the Sky	Nominated	
2001	1951 Retro-Hugo Awards	Best Novella	"...And Now You Don’t" (Note: The novella was originally serialized in 1949–50 and, retitled "Search by the Foundation", became the second part of the 1953 novel Second Foundation.)	Nominated	
2004	1954 Retro-Hugo Awards	Best Novel	The Caves of Steel	Nominated	
2012	2012 Locus Poll	Best 20th Century SF Novel	The Foundation Trilogy	3	
2012	2012 Locus Poll	Best 20th Century Novelette	"The Bicentennial Man"	4	
2012	2012 Locus Poll	Best 20th Century Novelette	"Foundation" (Note: The novelette was originally published in 1942 and, retitled "The Encyclopedists", became the second part of the 1951 novel Foundation.)	34	
2012	2012 Locus Poll	Best 20th Century Short Story	"Robbie"	29	
2012	2012 Locus Poll	Best 20th Century Short Story	"Liar!"	41	
2016	1941 Retro-Hugo Awards	Best Short Story	"Robbie"	Won	
2018	1943 Retro-Hugo Awards	Best Novelette	"Foundation"	Won	
2018	1943 Retro-Hugo Awards	Best Novelette	"Bridle and Saddle" (Note: The novelette was originally published in 1942 and, retitled "The Mayors", became the third part of the 1951 novel Foundation.)	Nominated	
2018	1943 Retro-Hugo Awards	Best Short Story	"Runaround"	Nominated	
2020	1945 Retro-Hugo Awards	Best Novelette	"The Big and the Little" (aka "The Merchant Princes") (Note: The novelette was originally published in 1944 as "The Big and the Little" and, retitled "The Merchant Princes", became the fifth part of the 1951 novel Foundation.)	Nominated	
2020	1945 Retro-Hugo Awards	Best Short Story	"The Wedge" (aka "The Traders") (Note: The short story was originally published in 1944 as "The Wedge" and, retitled "The Traders", became the fourth part of the 1951 novel Foundation.)	Nominated	
2023	2023 Seiun Awards	Best Translated Long Form	The Foundation Trilogy	Won	

== See also ==
- Church of Science
- Encyclopedia Galactica
- List of science fiction universes
- Völkerpsychologie
