= Pebble in the Sky =

1950 novel by American writer Isaac Asimov

- Hardback first edition cover
- Author: Isaac Asimov
- Cover artist: Richard M. Powers
- Language: English
- Series: Empire series
- Genre: Science fiction
- Publisher: Doubleday
- Publication date: January 19, 1950
- Publication place: United States
- Media type: Print (hardback and paperback)
- Pages: 223
- Preceded by: The Currents of Space
- Followed by: "Blind Alley"

Pebble in the Sky is a science fiction novel by American writer Isaac Asimov, published in 1950. This work is his first novel.

== Publication history ==
Pebble in the Sky was originally written in the summer of 1947 under the title "Grow Old with Me" for Startling Stories, whose editor Sam Merwin, Jr. had approached Asimov to write a forty thousand word short novel for the magazine. The title was an adaption of Robert Browning's Rabbi ben Ezra, the first few lines of which (starting "Grow old along with me! / The best is yet to be...") were included in the final novel. It was rejected by Startling Stories on the basis that the magazine's emphasis was more on adventure than science-heavy fiction (despite the editor inviting Asimov to write the latter as an experiment for the magazine), and again by John W. Campbell, Asimov's usual editor. In 1949, Doubleday editor Walter I. Bradbury accepted the story on the suggestion of Frederik Pohl, on the condition it was expanded to seventy thousand words and the title changed to something more science fiction oriented, and it was published in January 1950 as Pebble in the Sky. "Grow Old With Me" was later published in its original form along with other draft stories in The Alternate Asimovs in 1986.

In Before the Golden Age, Asimov wrote that Pebble in the Sky was influenced by the short story "Proxima Centauri" by Murray Leinster.

The book has been reprinted many times: in 1953 by Galaxy, in 1957 and 1964 by Bantam, in 1958 and 1982 by Corgi as the first British edition, in 1968 by Sidgwick & Jackson in hardcover, in 1969, 1972, 1974 (both paper and hard cover editions) and 1981 by Sphere Science Fiction, in 1971 and 1975 by Fawcett Books, in 1983 by Del Rey Books, in 1986 in hardcover by Grafton and in 1990 again by Doubleday in hardcover; in addition, it was reprinted as part of the Empire series, in 1986 by Ballantine Books, in 1992 by Spectra and in 2010 by Orb Books, in both print and Kindle editions.

Pebble in the Sky was also included in a number of omnibuses: first in 1952 in Triangle along with the others in the Empire series (The Stars, Like Dust and The Currents of Space which had only been published earlier that year), in 1978 in The Far Ends of Time and Earth along with The End of Eternity and the short story collection Earth Is Room Enough, and again with the Empire series novels in 2002 as The Empire Novels.

The book was adapted for radio by Ernest Kinoy for Dimension X as "Pebble in the Sky"; first broadcast in 1951 it was released as an audio download in 2007 by Radio Spirits, and again in 2011.

== Story background ==
The book begins with a retired tailor from the mid-20th century, who is accidentally pitched forward into the future. By then, Earth has become radioactive and is a low-status part of a vast Galactic Empire. There is both a mystery and a power-struggle, and a lot of debate and human choices. The protagonist is a very ordinary man, rather than the more typical space opera hero.

This book takes place in the same universe as the Foundation series. Earth is part of the Empire of Trantor, later the setting for Hari Seldon's invention of psychohistory. Asimov returned to the radioactive-Earth theme in The Stars, Like Dust; The Currents of Space; and Foundation and Earth. He would explore it most fully in Robots and Empire.

== Plot summary ==
While walking down the street in Chicago, Joseph Schwartz, a retired tailor, is the unwitting victim of a nearby nuclear laboratory accident, by means of which he is instantaneously transported tens of thousands of years into the future (50,000 years, by one character's estimate, a figure later retconned by future Asimov works as a "mistake"). He finds himself in a place he does not recognize, and due to apparent changes in the spoken language that far into the future, he is unable to communicate with anyone. He wanders into a farm, and is taken in by the couple that lives there. They mistake him for a mentally deficient person, and they secretly offer him as a subject for an experimental procedure to increase his mental abilities. The procedure, which has killed several subjects, works in his case, and he finds that he can quickly learn to speak the current lingua franca. He also slowly realizes that the procedure has given him strong telepathic abilities, including the ability to project his thoughts to the point of killing or injuring a person.

The Earth, at this time, is seen by the rest of the Galactic Empire as a rebellious planet — it has rebelled three times in the past — and the inhabitants are widely frowned upon and discriminated against. Earth also has several large radioactive areas, although the cause is never really described. With large uninhabitable areas, it is a very poor planet, and anyone who is unable to work is legally required to be euthanized. The people of the Earth must also be executed when they reach the age of sixty, a procedure known as "The Sixty", with very few exceptions; mainly for people who have made significant contributions to society. That is a problem for Schwartz, who is now sixty-two years old.

The Earth is part of the Trantorian Galactic Empire, with a resident Procurator (who lives in a domed town in the high Himalayas) and a Galactic military garrison, but in practice it is ruled by a group of Earth-centered "religious fanatics" who believe in the ultimate superiority of Earthlings. They have created a new, deadly supervirus that they plan to use to kill or subjugate the rest of the Empire, and to avenge themselves for the way their planet has been treated by the galaxy at large. Citizens of the Empire are unaware of Earth's lethal viruses, and mistakenly believe it is Earth's radioactive environment that causes the characteristic syndrome of "Radiation Fever," and that Earthlings pose the Empire no threat.

Joseph Schwartz, along with Affret Shekt, the scientist who developed the new device that boosted Schwartz's mental powers, his daughter Pola Shekt, and visiting archaeologist Bel Arvardan, are captured by the rebels, but they escape with the help of Schwartz's new mental abilities, and they are narrowly able to stop the plan to release the virus. Schwartz uses his mental abilities to provoke a pilot from the Imperial garrison into bombing the site where the arsenal of the super-virus exists.

The book ends on a hopeful note — perhaps the Empire can be persuaded to restore the Earth and reintroduce uncontaminated soil.

== Reception ==
Boucher and McComas were disappointed by the novel, saying that despite Asimov's good ideas, "his heavy treatment and routine plot are disappointing. L. Sprague de Camp, however, recommended the novel highly, praising it as "excellent; one of the few really mature and professional jobs available in book form [in 1950]. . . . Asimov's characterization is good, his suspense is almost unbearable, and his handling of the theme of group prejudice is masterful." Galaxy Science Fiction's Floyd C. Gale told readers "Don't miss" it and the other Empire novels. Lester del Rey found the novel "a first-rate story."

Although Hugo Awards were established only in 1953, too late for the novel to be eligible, it was later retroactively nominated for the Retro-Hugo Award and finished 2nd among the novels nominated for a retrospective 1951 Hugo Award for the Best Novel (of 1950) in 2001, losing to a similarly named Farmer in the Sky by Robert A. Heinlein.

== Other media ==
On June 17, 1951, the NBC radio network broadcast a much abbreviated radio dramatization of Pebble in the Sky in the science fiction anthology series Dimension X. In this much abbreviated version (only 25 minutes), the whole story of time travel was cut out with Bel and Pola being the main characters. The ending was quite different, since the virus was released, leaving Earth alone as "a pebble in the sky".
