= Foundation and Empire =

1952 novel by Isaac Asimov

- Dust-jacket illustration from the first edition
- Author: Isaac Asimov
- Cover artist: Edd Cartier
- Language: English
- Series: Foundation series
- Genre: Science fiction
- Publisher: Gnome Press
- Publication date: 1952
- Publication place: United States
- Media type: Print (hardcover)
- Pages: 247
- Award: Retro Hugo for Best Novel for The Mule (1946, awarded 1996)
- Preceded by: Foundation
- Followed by: Second Foundation

Foundation and Empire is a science fiction novel by American writer Isaac Asimov originally published by Gnome Press in 1952. It is the second book in the Foundation series, and the fourth in the in-universe chronology. It takes place in two parts, originally published as separate novellas. The second part, "The Mule," won a Retro Hugo Award in 1996.

Foundation and Empire saw multiple publications—it also appeared in 1955 as Ace Double (but not actually paired with another book) D-125 under the title The Man Who Upset the Universe. The stories composing this volume were originally published in Astounding Magazine (with different titles) in 1945. Foundation and Empire was the second book in the Foundation trilogy. Decades later, Asimov wrote two further sequel novels and two prequels. Later writers have added authorized, and unauthorized, tales to the series.

== Publication history ==
Foundation and Empire is composed of two stories: "The General" and "The Mule". The former was first published in the April 1945 issue of Astounding Science Fiction under the title "Dead Hand", while the latter was first published in the November and December 1945 issues of the same magazine.

== Plot summary ==
=== "The General" ===
General Bel Riose of the Galactic Empire governs the planet Siwenna. He comes across myths regarding the Foundation and attempts to confirm them by coercing the aid of Ducem Barr, a Siwennian whose father Onum met the Foundation trader Hober Mallow decades ago. After further research through visiting Foundation territory, Riose determines that they are a threat to the Empire and declares war upon them, both to fulfill his duty to the Empire and satisfy his personal pursuit of glory. Barr is familiar with Hari Seldon's psychohistory and through it is confident of the Foundation's inevitable victory, an assertion Riose repeatedly disputes.

Riose captures and interrogates Lathan Devers, a Foundation trader who reveals in private to Barr that he allowed himself to be taken in order to disrupt Riose's operation from the inside. Devers is met by Ammel Brodrig, Emperor Cleon II's Privy Secretary who was sent to Riose in order to keep an eye on the general. Devers tries to implicate Riose in an attempt to overthrow Cleon. However, Brodrig betrays Devers to Riose. Barr knocks out Riose before he can subject Devers to more effective interrogation and Devers and Barr escape in the latter's ship. Barr only cooperated with Riose to prevent the discovery of a planned Siwennian uprising in the event of the Foundation's triumph over Riose.

Devers and Barr head to Trantor in an attempt at turning Cleon II against Riose by implicating the latter in a conspiracy to overthrow the former with the help of Brodrig. However, in their attempt to bribe their way up the chain of bureaucracy, they are caught in the act by a member of the Secret Police, but manage to flee the planet before they are arrested. During their escape, they intercept news of Bel Riose and Brodrig's recall and subsequent arrest for treason (both are later said to have been executed), which leads to Siwenna's rebellion and the end of the threat to the Foundation.

During the festivities celebrating Siwenna joining the Foundation, Barr explains to Devers and the Foundation's top merchant prince Sennet Forell that the social background of the Empire made the Foundation's victory inevitable regardless of what actions they and Bel Riose took, as only a strong Emperor and a strong general could have threatened the Foundation, but an Emperor is only strong by not allowing strong subjects to thrive, and Bel Riose's success made him into a threat that Cleon II needed to eliminate. With the Empire nearing its end and the Second Foundation not expected to be met until centuries later, the Foundation anticipates no further opposition. However, an internal conflict between the Foundation's merchant princes and the traders is foreshadowed.

=== "The Mule" ===
Approximately one hundred years later, the Empire, after its final phase of decline and civil war, has ceased to exist, Trantor has suffered "The Great Sack" by a "barbarian fleet," and only a small rump state of 20 agricultural planets remain. Most of galactic civilization has disintegrated into barbaric kingdoms.

The Foundation has become the dominant power in the galaxy, controlling its territory through its trading network. The outline of the Seldon Plan has become widely known, and Foundationists and many others believe that as it has accurately predicted previous events, the Foundation's formation of a Second Empire is inevitable. However, the leadership of the Foundation has become dictatorial and complacent, and many outer planets belonging to the Traders plan to revolt.

An external threat arises in the form of a mysterious man known only as the Mule. He is a mutant and can sense and manipulate the emotions of others, usually creating fear and/or total devotion within his victims. With this ability, he takes over the independent systems bordering the Foundation, and has them wage a war against it. In face of this new threat, the provincial Traders join with the central Foundation leaders against the Mule, believing him to be the new Seldon crisis.

As the Mule advances, the Foundation's leaders assume that Seldon predicted this attack, and that the scheduled hologram crisis message appearance of Seldon will again tell them how to win. To their surprise, they learn that Seldon predicted a civil war with the Traders, not the rise of the Mule. The tape stops when Terminus loses all power in a Mule attack, and the Foundation falls.

Foundation citizens Toran and Bayta Darell, along with the psychologist Ebling Mis and "Magnifico Giganticus," a clown fleeing the Mule's service, travel to different worlds of the Foundation, and to the Great Library of Trantor. The Darells and Mis seek to contact the Second Foundation, which they believe can defeat the Mule. They also suspect the Mule wishes to know where the Second Foundation is as well, so that he can use the First Foundation's technology to destroy it.

At the Great Library, Ebling Mis works until his health fatally deteriorates. As Mis lies dying, he tells Toran, Bayta, and Magnifico that he knows where the Second Foundation is. Before he can reveal its location, however, Bayta kills him. Bayta had realized, shortly before, that Magnifico was actually the Mule, who had used his powers in every planet they had previously visited. In the same way, he had forced Mis to continue working and find what the Mule was looking for. Bayta had killed Mis to prevent him from revealing the Second Foundation's whereabouts to the Mule.

The Darells are left on Trantor. The Mule leaves to reign over the Foundation and the rest of his new empire. The existence of the Second Foundation, as an organization centered on the science of psychology and mentalics, in contrast to the Foundation's focus on physical sciences, is now known to the Darells and the Mule. Now that the Mule has conquered the Foundation, he is the most powerful force in the galaxy, and the Second Foundation is the only threat to his eventual reign over the entire galaxy. The Mule promises that he will find the Second Foundation, while Bayta asserts that it has already prepared for him and thus that he will not have enough time before the Second Foundation reacts.

== Characters ==
=== "The General" / "Dead Hand" ===
- Bel Riose, the last strong general who attempted to capture the Foundation. Riose is based on the Roman general Belisarius.
- Ducem Barr, a Siwennian patrician, the only surviving son of Onum Barr, and a hostage of Riose.
- Lathan Devers, a trader sent to spy on Riose.
- Cleon II, the last strong emperor before "The Great Sack" of Trantor. Emperor Cleon II is based on the Roman emperor Justinian I.
- Ammel Brodrig, Cleon II's Privy Secretary.

=== "The Mule" ===
- The Mule, a mutant who captures the Foundation and attempts to establish a Second Empire.
  - Magnifico Giganticus, a fictitious identity assumed by the Mule to disguise himself and approach the unsuspecting Toran and Bayta Darell in Kalgan. Magnifico purports to be the former clown of the Mule, having escaped from his master.
- Toran and Bayta Darell, Husband and wife, Bayta a former citizen of The Foundation, Toran a trader of the periphery planet of Haven.
- Captain Han Pritcher, an intelligence agent for the Foundation, and the first to recognise the power of the Mule.
- Mayor Indbur III, Mayor of the Foundation during the Mule's conquest.
- Ebling Mis, the psychologist who discovered the location of the Second Foundation.
- Dagobert IX, one of the last emperors on Neotrantor.

== Reception ==
Groff Conklin described Foundation and Empire as "fine swashbuckling galactic adventure [based] on some extremely hard-headed, scientific and mature social-political thinking." Boucher and McComas, however, panned the volume, declaring that "Anyone with a nodding acquaintance with Gibbon, Breasted, or Prescott will find no new concepts [here] save the utterly incomprehensible ones contained in the author's own personal science of 'psycho-history'."

The Hugo Awards were established in 1953; making it too late for the novel to be eligible for nominations. However, parts of Foundation and Empire originally published in Astounding Science Fiction were later retroactively nominated for Retro-Hugo Awards, one of them winning the 1946 Retro-Hugo Award for the Best Novel (of 1945):

- "Dead Hand" (later retitled "The General") was 2nd among the novellas nominated for a retrospective 1946 Hugo Award for the Best Novella (of 1945) in 1996, losing to "Animal Farm" by George Orwell.
- "The Mule" won a retrospective 1946 Hugo Award for the Best Novel (of 1945) in 1996;

The Foundation trilogy, of which Foundation and Empire is the second book, won a Hugo Award in 1966 for Best All-Time Series.

== Sequels ==
- The sequel, Second Foundation, tells the rest of the Mule's story.
- In the fourth book in the series, Foundation's Edge, Asimov writes that the Mule had been a rogue member of the planet/society Gaia.
- The demise of the Empire's remnant on Trantor is told in "Trantor Falls" by Harry Turtledove in Foundation's Friends, a tribute collection.

== References in popular culture ==
The Visi-Sonor inspired the Holophonor, a similar instrument that appears several times in the cartoon Futurama.

The Deep Purple song "The Mule", from the album Fireball, is named after the character.

== Sources ==
- Chalker, Jack L.; Mark Owings (1998). The Science-Fantasy Publishers: A Bibliographic History, 1923–1998. Westminster, MD and Baltimore: Mirage Press, Ltd. p. 301.
