= Second Foundation =

1953 novel by Isaac Asimov

- Dust-jacket from the first edition
- Author: Isaac Asimov
- Cover artist: Ric Binkley
- Language: English
- Series: Foundation Series
- Genre: Science fiction
- Publisher: Gnome Press
- Publication date: May 15, 1953
- Publication place: United States
- Media type: Print (Hardcover)
- Pages: 210
- Preceded by: Foundation and Empire
- Followed by: Foundation's Edge

Second Foundation is the third novel of the Foundation Trilogy, the third published of the Foundation Series by the American writer Isaac Asimov, and the fifth in the in-universe chronology. It was first published in 1953 by Gnome Press.

Second Foundation consists of two novellas originally published in Astounding Magazine (with different titles) between 1948 and 1950: this makes it the third volume in Asimov's Foundation series. Decades later, Asimov wrote two sequel novels and two prequels. Later writers have added authorized tales to the series. The Foundation series is often regarded as one of Isaac Asimov's best works, along with his Robot series.

The term also describes the organization by that name which is the focus of the book. The organization's existence (and nothing more) had been revealed in Foundation; it is searched for in Foundation and Empire, and it makes essential appearances in this novel. It would not be described in detail until Foundation's Edge.

== Publication history ==
The publication history consisted of the following parts:

- Part I: Search by the Mule was originally published under the title Now You See It... in the January 1948 issue of Astounding Science Fiction.
- Part II: Search by the Foundation was originally published in the November 1949, December 1949 and January 1950 issues of Astounding under the title ...And Now You Don't.

The Second Foundation would be revisited in Foundation's Edge.

== Plot summary ==
=== Part I: Search by the Mule ===
Part I is about the Mule's search for the elusive Second Foundation, with the intent of destroying it. The executive council of the Second Foundation is aware of The Mule's intent and, in the words of the First Speaker, allows him to find it—"in a sense". The Mule sends two of his people on a search for the Second Foundation: Han Pritcher, who had once been a captain and a member of the underground opposition prior to being Converted to the Mule's service, and Bail Channis, an "Unconverted" man (one who has not been emotionally manipulated by the Mule to join him) who has quickly risen through the ranks and impressed the Mule.

Channis reveals his suspicions about the Second Foundation being located on the planet Tazenda, and takes the ship there. They first land on Rossem, a barren planet controlled by Tazenda, and meet with its governor, who appears ordinary. Once they return to the ship, Pritcher confronts Channis and believes him to have been too successful with the search. The Mule, who had placed a hyper-relay on their ship in order to trace them through hyper-space, appears, and reveals that Channis is a Second Foundationer. Pritcher's emotional bonds to the Mule are broken in the ensuing exchange between Channis and the Mule, and he is made to fall into deep sleep. With only the two of them left, the Mule reveals that he has brought his ships to Tazenda and has already destroyed the planet, and yet senses that Channis's dismay is only pretense. He forces Channis to reveal that Rossem is actually the Second Foundation, and that Tazenda is only a figurehead.

The First Speaker for the Second Foundation appears and reveals to the Mule that his rule is over; neither Tazenda nor Rossem is the Second Foundation, and Channis's knowledge had been falsely implanted to mislead the Mule. Second Foundation agents are headed to Kalgan and the Foundation worlds to undo the Conversions of the Mule, and his fleet is too far away to prevent it. When the Mule experiences a moment of despair, the First Speaker is able to seize control of and change his mind; he will return to Kalgan and live out the rest of his short life as a peaceful despot.

=== Part II: Search by the Foundation ===
Part II takes place 60 years after the first part, 55 years after the Mule's death by natural causes. With the Mule gone, his former empire falls apart and the Foundation resumes its independence. Because of their enslavement at the hands of the Mule and their wariness of the Second Foundation (who possess similar abilities to the Mule) the Foundation began studying the mental sciences.

A secret cabal is formed within the Foundation to root out the Second Foundation after evidence of the latter's manipulation is found through mental analysis of the former society's key figures. They send one of their own, Homir Munn, to Kalgan to search for clues to the Second Foundation's location. Munn is followed to Kalgan by Arcadia, Dr Darell's daughter.

Since the death of the Mule, the Second Foundation has worked to restore the Seldon Plan to its proper course. In the organization's secret location, the First Speaker discusses the state of the galaxy with a student. The Student is concerned that the Foundation's now tangible knowledge of the Second Foundation's existence would have negative effects upon the former which would then further destabilize the Seldon Plan. The First Speaker reassures the Student that a plan has been put in place by their organization in order to address his very concerns.

In Kalgan, a man named Stettin has assumed the Mule's former title as First Citizen. He believes that the Mule's actions have made the Seldon Plan irrelevant and declares war upon the Foundation, intending to usurp their role in the formation of the Second Empire. He is unconcerned with the possible intervention of the Second Foundation.

Arcadia escapes from Kalgan to Trantor with the help of a Trantorian trader named Preem Palver. With his help, she passes information to her father regarding the location of the Second Foundation.

Kalgan eventually loses the war against the Foundation as the specter of the Seldon Plan adversely affects the performance of the Kalganians every bit as much as it bolsters the morale of the Foundationers.

The Foundation cabal reconvenes to discuss what they have learned about the Second Foundation. Munn believes that the Second Foundation never existed while Pelleas Anthor believes they are in Kalgan. Dr Darell states that the Second Foundation is in Terminus itself based on information supplied by Arcadia. He also reveals he has created a device capable of emitting mind static, which is harmful to individuals with mental abilities similar to that of the Mule and the Second Foundation. Activating the device in the presence of the cabal reveals Anthor to be a Second Foundationer, and further interrogation leads to the discovery of the rest of his comrades who are subsequently detained indefinitely.

Unsatisfied with the ease by which the Second Foundation has been defeated and suspecting Arcadia's information to be planted through mental tampering, Dr Darell runs tests on his daughter to determine if she has been compromised. Both are relieved when the tests' results are negative. Dr Darell basks in the realization that with the Second Foundation gone, the First Foundation is the sole inheritor of the Seldon Plan and the Second Empire.

However, the Second Foundation is not only intact but has planned and orchestrated the recent major events. The Foundation's conflict with Kalgan and their subsequent victory was meant to restore the former's self-esteem after the Mule enslaved them. Anthor and his comrades were in fact martyrs meant to mislead the Foundation into believing they had eliminated the Second Foundation, thereby shrouding the Second Foundation in secrecy once more and restoring the Seldon Plan to its proper course. Arcadia was unknowingly working for the Second Foundation, having been mentally adjusted shortly after her birth in order to prevent detection. The Second Foundation is actually located at the planet Trantor, the seat of the former Galactic Empire.

The story closes with the revelation that the First Speaker of the Second Foundation is Preem Palver, who is satisfied that the galaxy is now forever secure.

== Reception ==
On its initial publication, Galaxy reviewer Groff Conklin described Second Foundation as "a thoroughly satisfying and adult play of the scientific imagination". P. Schuyler Miller reported Second Foundation to be "good, sound, middle-of-the-road science fiction with a carefully hidden surprise".

== The organization ==
The Second Foundation was founded by Hari Seldon as a budding colony of psychologists and mentalics, people with telepathic abilities, located "at Star's End", an intentionally obscure term used by Seldon. In Forward the Foundation, the original Second Foundation is revealed to also include Hari's own granddaughter, Wanda Seldon, and his bodyguard Stettin Palver.

The establishment, location and development of this Foundation was a secret, "drowned in silence" to increase its effectiveness and security.

Whilst the First Foundation was strong in the physical sciences, the Second Foundation was strong in the mental sciences, including the continued development of psychohistory. Their function is to ensure that the Seldon plan comes to pass, both by refining the plan's contingencies to allow for even the most unlikely events, and to guard against unexpected developments, such as the Mule. Their eventual goal is to become the ruling class of the Second Empire in an effort to introduce mental sciences to humanity (whose benefits are, according to one Second Foundationer, less apparent, but longer lasting than physical sciences), while the First Foundation they manipulate forms the necessary political union.

The Second Foundation are governed by a council of the strongest mentalics, called the Speakers. However, the name "Speaker" is a misnomer, because, being telepaths, the use of actual speech is quite unnecessary. The leader of the group is the First Speaker. The only formal power of the First Speaker was to speak first at meetings of the Speaker's Table, but in practice it conferred significantly more power.

The structure of the Second Foundation is akin to both an intelligence network and a university. A complex of buildings on Trantor, the remnants of those saved from The Great Sack and those not demolished to provide metal for export, house a staff of technicians and analysts. Into these buildings flow reports from agents located in many parts of the Galaxy; these reports form the basis of any action that may be taken in furthering the aim of the Seldon Plan.

The Second Foundation spreads a net over the galaxy to detect and recruit staff and agents. These are then specially trained over many years. Some become statistical technicians, but the best of the trainees are invited to commence an apprenticeship for Speakerhood.

== Sources ==
- Chalker, Jack L.; Mark Owings (1998). The Science-Fantasy Publishers: A Bibliographic History, 1923-1998. Westminster, MD and Baltimore: Mirage Press, Ltd. pp. 302–303.
