= Great Stories of Space Travel =

1963 anthology edited by Groff Conklin

- Cover of first edition
- Editor: Groff Conklin
- Language: English
- Genre: Science fiction
- Publisher: Tempo Books
- Publication date: 1963
- Publication place: United States
- Media type: Print (paperback)
- Pages: 256

Great Stories of Space Travel is an American anthology of science fiction short stories edited by Groff Conklin. It was first published in paperback by Tempo Books in July 1963, and reprinted by the same publisher in December 1965, 1969, and April 1970.

The book collects eleven novelettes and short stories by various science fiction authors, together with a general introduction and brief introductions to each story by the editor. The stories were previously published from 1942-1955 in various science fiction and other magazines.

== Contents ==
- "Introduction" (Groff Conklin)
- The Solar System
  - "The Wings of Night" (Lester del Rey)
  - "The Holes Around Mars" (Jerome Bixby)
  - "Kaleidoscope" (Ray Bradbury)
  - "I'll Build Your Dream Castle" (Jack Vance)
- Beyond the Solar System
  - "Far Centaurus" (A. E. van Vogt)
  - "Propagandist" (Murray Leinster)
  - "Cabin Boy" (Damon Knight)
  - "A Walk in the Dark" (Arthur C. Clarke)
  - "Blind Alley" (Isaac Asimov)
  - "The Helping Hand" (Poul Anderson)
  - "Allamagoosa" (Eric Frank Russell)
