= Hallucination (short story) =

1985 science fiction short story by Isaac Asimov

"Hallucination" is a science fiction short story by American writer Isaac Asimov. It first appeared in Boys' Life in 1985, and was collected in Gold. Its storyline is similar to that of his novel Nemesis.

== Plot summary ==
"Hallucination" takes place at a time in the future although the exact date or era is not specific. The action takes place on Energy Planet, a rocky earth-like planet orbiting a neutron star in the Milky Way. All characters are human (as are most of Asimov's characters) except the extraterrestrial insectoids. The story is divided into three parts.

Part One: The main character, Sam Chase, a fifteen-year-old, reluctantly arrives on Energy Planet. There he will serve a three-year tour of duty with an unnamed terrestrial military group while receiving training in gravitational engineering. The Central Computer has assigned Chase, who hoped to pursue neurophysiology, to gravitational engineering so he can aid in the military engineers' efforts to harness the energy of the Neutron Star (hence the name Energy Planet). Upon meeting Dr. Donald Gentry on his first day there, Chase learns that people have experienced hallucinations under the Dome.

Part Two: Chase meets the Insects and converses with them. Insects take Chase’s shape in “hallucination”.

Part Three: Chase convinces the Commander to respect the insectoids. The commander agrees with this decision.
