= Prelude to Foundation =

1988 novel by Isaac Asimov

- Cover of the first edition
- Author: Isaac Asimov
- Cover artist: Boris Vallejo
- Language: English
- Series: Foundation Series
- Genre: Science fiction
- Publisher: Doubleday
- Publication date: November 1988
- Publication place: United States
- Media type: Print (hardcover and paperback)
- Pages: 403
- ISBN: 0-385-23313-2
- Preceded by: Blind Alley
- Followed by: Forward the Foundation

Prelude to Foundation is a novel by American writer Isaac Asimov, published in 1988. It is one of two prequels to the Foundation series. For the first time, Asimov chronicles the fictional life of Hari Seldon, the man who invented psychohistory and the intellectual hero of the series. The novel was nominated for the Locus Award. It has a sequel, Forward the Foundation.

== Plot summary ==
Prelude to Foundation is set in the year 12,020 G.E. (Galactic Era), during the rocky reign of the Emperor Cleon I. It starts with Seldon's presentation of a paper at a mathematics convention detailing how psychohistory might theoretically make it possible to predict the future. The Emperor of the Galactic Empire learns of this and wants to use Seldon for political gain. In a face-to-face interview, Seldon emphasizes that psychohistory is something that he has not even begun developing or even has a clear idea how to do so, but Cleon is not wholly convinced that Hari is of no use to the Empire.

Seldon then meets reporter Chetter Hummin, who convinces him that Cleon's first minister, Eto Demerzel, is attempting to capture him, and that it is therefore imperative for Seldon to escape and try to make psychohistory practical. He is taken by Hummin to Streeling University, one of the top ranked of the Empire and introduced to Dors Venabili by Hummin. Seldon theorizes that the first development of psychohistory requires a smaller, yet still significant sample than the entire Empire, possibly just the original world where humans originated...which is now lost, along with much of the older historical records.

Hari and Dors narrowly evade capture at Streeling University, and Hummin arranges for them to be sheltered in the reclusive Mycogen sector, which supposedly values its ancient history. Seldon and Venabili are welcomed by Sunmaster Fourteen, the leader of Mycogen. Seldon obtains the Mycogenians' treasured religious/historical book, but finds it disappointing except for the revelation of what the Mycogenians call their home planet, Aurora, and references to "robots" (which do not exist in the Empire). Seldon and Venabili face execution when Seldon insists on entering the Mycogenian "temple", the Sacratorium, in disguise in hopes of interviewing a robot supposedly housed there. They are easily detected, but Hummin arrives in the nick of time to save them.

The action then shifts to the Dahl sector, where Seldon and Venabili rent rooms from a middle-class family. While in Dahl, they meet a guttersnipe named Raych, whom Seldon later adopts. Also in Dahl, they are told by an old wise woman that the Aurora of the Mycogenians is not the original world, but actually the "enemy" of the original human planet, called Earth. (This links with the Robot series.)

Towards the end of the novel, Seldon, Venabili, and Raych are kidnapped and forcibly taken to see Rashelle, who is the mayor of Wye, a powerful and vital sector situated at Trantor's south pole. Rashelle and her father have long been plotting to overthrow the Emperor and take his place. Seldon has the revelation that he could try to develop psychohistory using Trantor itself as a test case because of the great cultural diversity of its sectors. Rashelle launches her coup attempt, but it quickly collapses due to Demerzel's skillful subversion of Wye's forces. The finale reveals that "Hummin" is actually Eto Demerzel. Seldon then gets Demerzel to admit he is a robot; Demerzel is in fact R. Daneel Olivaw, who can influence humans mentally. He wants the development of psychohistory to help him better protect humanity, as per "The Zeroth Law Of Robotics". Seldon also suspects Venabili of being a robot, as well. This theme would subsequently be continued in Forward the Foundation.

== Characters ==
Below is a list of all the major and minor characters in the book, in order of appearance (and with brief descriptions).

- Hari Seldon is the protagonist of the story. He develops the theory of psychohistory.
- Cleon I is the Emperor of the Galactic Empire, who lives on Trantor.
- Eto Demerzel, First Minister to the Emperor, is sly, has connections everywhere, and attempts to capture Seldon for his knowledge of psychohistory.
- Chetter Hummin is a reporter who helps Seldon numerous times, setting him up at various sectors to avoid Imperial detection.
- Dors Venabili is a history professor at the university recruited by Hummin to protect Seldon. She follows him throughout the book.
- Jenarr Leggen is a meteorologist at Streeling University, who helps Venabili track Seldon using specialized equipment when the latter becomes lost.
- Rogen Benastra is the Chief Seismologist at Streeling University, who helps Dors find Hari after he becomes lost in the cold Upperside.
- Endor Levanian is the pilot who flies Seldon and Venabili to the Mycogen sector.
- Sunmaster Fourteen is a High Elder of the Mycogen sector.
- Graycloud Five is a novitiate resident of the Mycogen sector.
- Raindrop Forty-three and Raindrop Forty-five are two Sisters who help Seldon and Venabili with various aspects of life in Mycogen. They are also agents reporting to Sunmaster Fourteen.
- Mycelium Seventy-Two is a Mycogenian scholar whom Hari and Dors meet on the gravibus to the Sacratorium.
- Skystrip Two is an Elder of the Sacratorium in Mycogen.
- Jirad Tisalver is a resident working as a holovision programmer of the Dahl sector who takes Seldon and Venabili into his home.
- Hano Linder is a heatsink manager of the Dahl sector.
- Yugo Amaryl is a heatsink worker who aspires to be a mathematician like Seldon.
- Raych is a child from Billibotton who helps Seldon and Venabili find their way around in exchange for rewards.
- Mother Rittah is a local prophet of Billibotton in the Dahl sector who gives Seldon information regarding Earth, as well as "Da-Nee" and "Ba-Lee", R. Daneel Olivaw and the Baley family, respectively (see also the Robot series article).
- Davan is a subversive of Billibotton who aims to unite the downtrodden against the oppressive Empire.
- Sergeant Emmer Thalus is a soldier instructed to bring Seldon to the Wye sector.
- Rashelle is the daughter of Mannix IV and current mayor of Wye.

== Influences ==
The novel is one of French politician Jean-Luc Mélenchon's main metapolitical sources of inspirations.
