= Nemesis (Asimov novel) =

1989 science-fiction novel by Isaac Asimov

- Cover of the first edition
- Author: Isaac Asimov
- Cover artist: Don Dixon
- Language: English
- Genre: Science fiction
- Publisher: Bantam Books
- Publication date: October 1989
- Publication place: United States
- Media type: Print (Hardcover & Paperback)
- Pages: 386+
- ISBN: 0-385-24792-3 (Hardcover edition) ISBN 0-553-28628-5 (Paperback edition)
- OCLC: 19628406
- Dewey Decimal: 813/.54 20
- LC Class: PS3551.S5 N46 1989

Nemesis is a science fiction novel by American writer Isaac Asimov. One of his later science fiction novels, it was published in 1989, three years before his death. This novel is connected to Asimov's other works by several ideas from earlier and later novels, including non-human intelligence, sentient astronomical bodies ("Hallucination"), and rotor engines (Fantastic Voyage II: Destination Brain).

== Plot summary ==
The novel is set in an era in which interstellar travel is in the process of being discovered and perfected. In Chapter 2, the novel states that the year 2220 was 16 years ago. Accordingly, the bulk of the novel takes place in or around the year 2236.

Before the novel's opening, "hyper-assistance", a technology allowing travel just shy of the speed of light, is used to move a reclusive space station colony called Rotor from the vicinity of Earth to the newly discovered red dwarf Nemesis. There, it takes up orbit around the semi-habitable moon Erythro, named for the red light that falls on it.

It is eventually discovered that the bacterial life on Erythro forms a collective organism that possesses a form of consciousness and telepathy. While the colonists argue over the direction of future colonization—down to Erythro, or up to the asteroid belts of Nemesis system—events catch up with them. Back on Earth superluminal flight is perfected, ending Rotor Colony's isolation and opening the galaxy to human exploration.

The story also relates the breakup and reunion of a family. The mother, who discovered Nemesis, and her daughter were separated from the Earthbound father when the colony departed. The father then becomes part of the hyperjump research project as a result. Important in the novel is the startling discovery that the bacterial inhabitants of Erythro collectively constitute a sentient and telepathic organism and the discovery and resolution of a massive crisis: Nemesis' trajectory threatens to gravitationally destabilize the Solar System.

== Story notes ==
The demands of the plot required Asimov to hypothesize a planetary system about a star named Nemesis. At the time of the writing, the name Nemesis was given to a hypothetical companion to Earth's Sun that could provide a mechanism for periodic disturbances of comets in the Oort cloud, which would then fall inwards causing mass extinctions. The red dwarf star in the book turns out not to be this companion; it is simply passing through the Solar System.

The planetary system in the book included a gas giant planet named Megas in a very short-period orbit about its primary star. (Erythro is a moon of Megas.) This was a radical idea in 1989, but was vindicated with the discovery of the first extrasolar planet orbiting a sun-like star (51 Pegasi) in 1995, dubbed "Bellerophon". Furthermore, the first speculated "habitable" planet discovered, Gliese 581c, orbits a red dwarf star (Gliese 581) located only 20.3 light years from Earth—a notable similarity to the novel wherein Erythro is the first inhabited extra–solar body.

In the foreword of the novel, Asimov stated that Nemesis is not a part of the Foundation universe that consists of the Foundation, Robot, and Empire series. In his autobiography he said that it was in fact his editor Jennifer Brehl who had suggested a novel which was "not part of either the Foundation series or the Robot series, but ... an entirely independent background." In the foreword he also stated that he may change his mind on the matter.

Some have suspected that the radiation from the star Nemesis may have been intended to be another possible reason for the radiation on Earth forcing emigration. However, Nemesis is referred to in Forward the Foundation, where Hari Seldon refers to a twenty-thousand-year-old story of "a young woman that could communicate with an entire planet that circled a sun named Nemesis." A few commentators noted that Nemesis contains barely disguised references to the Spacers and their calendar system, the Galactic Empire and even to Hari Seldon which seem to have been deliberately placed for the purpose of later integration into the Foundation universe.

According to Alasdair Wilkins, in a discussion posted on Gizmodo, "Asimov absolutely loves weird, elliptical structures. All three of his non-robot/Foundation science fiction novels — The End of Eternity, The Gods Themselves, and Nemesis — leaned heavily on non-chronological narratives, and he does it with gusto in The Gods Themselves."

== Major characters ==
- Dr. Eugenia Insigna Fisher: from the Euro-dominated Rotor Colony; astronomer for the Far Probe project; discoverer of Nemesis
- Crile Fisher: a fetcher (technological espionage operative) for Earth
- Marlene Fisher: homely daughter of Crile and Eugenia; can read body language exceptionally well
- Dr. Janus Pitt: Commissioner of Rotor; enemy of Eugenia, Crile, and Marlene
- Siever Genarr: Erythro Dome Chief, former admirer of Eugenia
- Ranay D'Aubisson: Chief Neurophysicist of the Erythro Dome
- Dr. Tessa Anita Wendel: from Adelia Colony; Chief Physicist in Superluminal Theory
- Kattimoro Tanayama: Director of Earth Intelligence
- Igor Koropatsky: Tanayama's successor after he dies
- Aurinel Pampas: attractive 17-year-old boy on whom Marlene has a crush

== Reception ==
On Kirkus Reviews, the novel is said to be "a medium-future space drama, often quite absorbing despite the absence of a theme or even much of a plot" and a "low-key, oddly likable performance considering that, despite all the complicated maneuvering, nothing much happens: the old Asimov charm keeps the pages turning".

According to SF Site, Isaac Asimov seems to "feel[s] obliged to apologize for the fact that it is completely unrelated to any of his own novels". Nemesis turns out to be "in fact nothing more than an average Isaac Asimov novel" with good and bad points summarized as follows: "On the positive side, that means that it has intelligent and thoughtful ideas, a carefully crafted plot, and a well-maintained sense of suspense. On the negative side, that means that it offers generally perfunctory characterization, an undistinguished prose style, and an excessive emphasis on endless conversation—as in a soap opera, Asimov's characters spend far more time talking about what they are doing than actually doing anything."
