= Foundation's Triumph =

1999 novel by David Brin

- The Second Foundation Trilogy: Foundation's Triumph
- Author: David Brin
- Cover artist: J.P. Targete
- Language: English
- Series: The Second Foundation Trilogy
- Genre: Science fiction
- Publisher: Harper Prism
- Publication date: May 1999
- Publication place: United States
- Media type: Print (hardback & paperback)
- Pages: 400
- ISBN: 978-0-06-105639-0
- OCLC: 44441065
- LC Class: CPB Box no. 1824 vol. 23
- Preceded by: Foundation and Chaos

Foundation's Triumph (1999) is a science fiction novel by American writer David Brin, set in Isaac Asimov's Foundation universe. It is the third book of a trilogy written after Asimov's death by three authors, authorized by the Asimov estate. Brin synthesizes dozens of Foundation-Empire-Robots novels and short stories by Isaac Asimov, Roger MacBride Allen, and authorized others into a consistent framework. Foundation's Triumph includes an appendix chronology compiled by Attila Torkos.

== Plot summary ==
Foundation’s Triumph starts with Hari Seldon who reviews his life and has to accept the fact that his “purpose” is completed. One day he meets a bureaucrat, Horis Antic, who explains his theory about the correlation of certain soils on planets and psychohistory. Seldon agrees to take a trip to some of the planets which fit Antic's theory. Hari and Horis travel to Demarchia, where they rent a yacht.

Parallel to Seldon's story, Dors Venabili starts out on the planet Panucopia to meet Lodovik Trema, a robot whose Three Laws of Robotics have been erased. Lodovic gives her the head of R. Giskard Reventlov, an important robot who founded the Zeroth Law with R. Daneel Olivaw. She finds out that Giskard and Daneel never consulted a human while founding the Zeroth Law. Later Trema meets a faction of cyborgs and joins them. After Dors has become a rebel, she fights for the cyborgs as well.

The third plot of the novel takes place on the planet Eos. Daneel talks to his possible successor Zun Lurrin. All chapters with Olivaw as the main character are printed in a different typeface.

In Seldon's story, during the flight to the first planet the yacht is taken over by rebels, who are from the renaissance or chaos planet Ktlina. They show Seldon ancient spaceships with many data capsules from the human past. Robots take over the yacht and destroy the data capsules and the ancient ships with the permission of Seldon. During the flight back to Trantor, a rebel, Gornon Vlimt, turns out to be another robot from a faction of Calvinians, who want to send Hari into the future.

At last all factions meet on Earth. The Calvinians are stopped by Daneel and Wanda Seldon. Old friends Seldon and Daneel meet one final time, to discuss philosophy. Despite the apparent eventual dominance of Galaxia, Seldon confides his belief that the second Galactic Empire will include both the two Foundations, following the Seldon Plan, and Galaxia. "Will there be an Encyclopedia Galactica a thousand years from now," asks Seldon, betting that if his belief is correct, there will be regularly updated editions of it. Since most Foundation novels use the Encyclopedia as a framing device for its chapters, this implies that Seldon correctly predicted the successful synthesis of the two Foundations and Galaxia.

== Possible sequel ==
Brin stated in his book that he could well imagine to write a sequel to Foundation's Triumph, or that another author might. He refrained from giving any details on what was on his mind. Brin also noted that he might release a rough start one day; the author later did on his website, which he titled "Denouement".

== Reviews ==
- Review by Curt Wohleber (1999) in Science Fiction Weekly, 26 Apr 1999
- Review by Mark L. Olson (1999) in Aboriginal Science Fiction, Fall 1999
- Review by Nigel Brown (1999) in Interzone, #149 November 1999
- Review by Gary Wilkinson (1999) in Vector 208
- Review by Steve Jeffery (2000) in Vector 211
- Review by Russell Blackford (2002) in The New York Review of Science Fiction, March 2002
