= The Alternate Asimovs =

1986 collection of early science fiction drafts by Isaac Asimov

- First edition cover Cover art by Barclay Shaw
- Author: Isaac Asimov
- Genre: Science fiction
- Publisher: Doubleday

The Alternate Asimovs (1986) is a collection of early science fiction drafts by American writer Isaac Asimov. Asimov mostly threw away early drafts. Just a few survived and were included in this anthology.

It consists of three items:

- Grow Old With Me, the original version of the novel Pebble in the Sky, never published in this form
- "The End of Eternity", an unpublished 20,000 word novella that was extensively revised before appearing as the novel The End of Eternity
- "Belief", two versions of a short story

== Grow Old With Me ==
This is a shorter and less refined version of the book Pebble in the Sky; set in the very early days of the Trantorian Empire whose eventual decline had been described in the Foundation novels. The plot is largely the same, though the chief villain is less developed.

Asimov also explained how he began with the idea that Earth was radioactive from an atomic war. As he learned more, he became unhappy with the notion, reckoning that a war would not make the crust radioactive without also wiping out all life, hence the revised notion in Robots and Empire.

== "The End of Eternity" ==
A 25,000 word novella that was extensively changed for the book-length The End of Eternity, it tells of an organisation of time travellers dedicated to the betterment of humanity by tampering with history. However, control brings problems, sometimes tragedies.

Elements of the later novel are there. But 'Andrew Harlan' was a merger of two different characters from the short story. The ending is quite different, and Asimov himself called it weak.

The biggest difference with the novel is that Eternity does not end; it is heroically saved. The original story has Anders Horemm the technician who does the damage, and then Genro Manfield the historian who sets things right again. These were combined into 'Andrew Harlan' for the novel.

Anders Horemm has much the same relationship with Nöys Lambent, but she is no more than she seems. The reality-change removes the belief that 'Eternals' can grant eternal life. As a regrettable side-effect, Nöys Lambent vanishes. Horemm has a breakdown, comes back as Twissell's technician. Like Harlan, he sabotages the trip into the past, but that is the end of his role.

Manfield also has a bad experience – the unhappy liaison that is transferred to Twissell in the book version. But he stays loyal to Eternity, completing his mission to the past.

The history that Manfield's Eternity grew out of matches our own history, with an atomic bomb in 1945. It is also a different future from that of the Galactic Empire, with humans remaining on Earth until the 'two hundred thousandth century' – 20 million years. The eventual fate of humans is left uncertain.

== Reception ==
Dave Langford reviewed The Alternate Asimovs for White Dwarf #93, and stated that "Keep your dreadful unsaleable manuscripts for 40 years, goes the encouraging message, and Grafton will give you big money for them..."

== Reviews ==
- Review by W. D. Stevens (1986) in Fantasy Review, February 1986
- Review by Elton T. Elliott (1986) in Science Fiction Review, Spring 1986
- Review by Algis Budrys (1986) in The Magazine of Fantasy & Science Fiction, June 1986
- Review by Don D'Ammassa (1986) in Science Fiction Chronicle, #82 July 1986
- Review by L. J. Hurst (1987) in Paperback Inferno, #68
