= Mickey Zucker Reichert =

American author

- Miriam Susan Zucker Reichert
- Born: Miriam Susan Zucker; 1962 (age 63–64); Camden, New Jersey, USA
- Citizenship: American
- Occupations: Physician, Writer, Author, Novelist, Teacher
- Children: 2 Children
- Writing career
- Pen name: M. Z. Reichert
- Language: English
- Genres: fantasy, shapechangers, science fiction, fantasy short story, foxes, wizards, centaurs, dragons, unicorns
- Website: mickeyzuckerreichert.com

Mickey Zucker Reichert (born as Miriam Susan Zucker in 1962) is an American fantasy fiction author of several best selling novels.

== Personal life ==
Reichert is a pediatrician, and holds a Doctorate of Medicine (M.D.). She is from a town in Iowa. She and her husband have fostered and adopted children, as well as a variety of animals "from mice to horses".

Her novels are published by DAW Books. DAW published her first novel via Sheila Gilbert, who is still Reichert's editor over 25 years later.

== Notable works ==
Reichert has published more than 22 novels, an illustrated novella, and more than 50 short stories.

=== Renshai series ===
She is known for her Renshai series, which provides a different perspective on traditional Norse mythology. It is the story of a battle between good vs evil vs neutrality. It focuses around Norse mythology. The story largely centers around the survivors from a tribe of master swordsmen who are decimated in a coordinated attack by the majority of their neighboring countries, and a few other characters.

These three books focus on the character of Colbey Calistinsson in addition to other characters that play central roles in the storyline. Colbey is the most skilled swordsman the Renshai tribe has ever known. Yet, after his tribe is almost completely eradicated, he is forced to search for purpose and also determine a new course for his existence. Otherwise the evil forces of the East will destroy the neutral forces of the West in the Great War that is prophesied to plunge more than half of the continent in a violent war.

Later in the series Colbey acquires powerful telepathic and psychic abilities. This, he discovers in the third book, stems from his heritage. Colbey is in fact the son of Thor, the Norse God of Thunder, and the grandson of Odin, King of the Norse Gods. He is the son of a god and a mortal woman from a mighty warrior tribe (Renshai). However, true to character, he is undaunted by this knowledge, and soldiers on through many quests with his sense of purpose and his dedication to only do what he feels is right regardless of the consequences - even if it may possibly result in the Ragnarok and bring about the end of the world. Eventually, he marries the goddess Freya.

=== I, Robot ===
Reichert was asked to write three prequels to I, Robot by Isaac Asimov's estate. She first met Asimov when she was 23, although she did not know him well. The prequels were ordered by Berkley Books.

== Bibliography ==
Series	Title	Year	ISBN	Notes	Ref.
The Bifrost Guardians 1	Godslayer	1987		A young man is drafted to Vietnam and prays to Freyr, the Norse god of war, during a battle. His prayers are answered. He finds himself in a new world, battling wizards, swordsman, and even dragons.	
The Bifrost Guardians 2	Shadow Climber	1988		A young orphan learns to survive the tough streets. He becomes a master thief. And he goes on to become a part of a heroic group.	
The Bifrost Guardians 3	Dragonrank Master	1988		A young woman who is incredibly talented in magic is entangled in a deadly plot. A group of heroes come to her rescue.	
Short story	"Homecoming" (Space & Time, Winter 1989; Women at War)	1989			
Short story	"The Ulfjarl’s Stone" (Magical Beginnings)	1989			
The Bifrost Guardians 4	Shadow's Realm	1990		A heroic group returns to a member's home, and deals with the consequences.	
The Bifrost Guardians 5	By Chaos Cursed	1991		The heroic group has become epic. They travel through time itself to return to a member's home in modern New York City in hopes of defeating an incredible power.	
Short story	"Love at First Ride" (Horse Fantastic)	1991			
Short story	"The Eranis Pipe" (Halflings, Hobbits, Warrows & Weefolk: A Collection of Tales of Heroes Short in Stature)	1991			
Renshai Chronicles 1	The Last of the Renshai	1992	ISBN 0-88677-503-5	The first book in The Renshai Trilogy. This trilogy is set in the world of Midgard (of Norse mythology) and incorporates the gods of Norse mythology: Odin, Thor, Sif, Loki, etc. Midgard is divided into four parts East, West, North, and South, each with a Wizard watching over them to preserve the balance of Good and Evil as decreed by Odin. But an ancient prophecy foretells of one of a tribe of Northmen (the Renshai, known to be incomparable warriors) that will bring about the destruction of Midgard and of many of the gods. The other tribes of northmen descend upon the tribe under cover of night and exterminate all but three, Episte, Rache and Colbey Calistinsson. This first book is the story of Rache, and his struggle to survive and find a home. The trilogy as a whole deals with the coming of the Ragnarok, and how it comes to pass.	
Renshai Chronicles 2	The Western Wizard	1992			
Renshai Chronicles 3	Child of Thunder	1992			
Short story	"The Champion of Dragons" (Dragon Fantastic; A Dragon-Lover’s Treasury of the Fantastic; Dragons: The Greatest Stories; Dragon Fantastic)	1992			
Short story	"The Gray God's Challenge" (The Gods of War)	1992			
Legend of Nightfall 1	The Legend of Nightfall	1993			
Novel	The Unknown Soldier	1994			
Short story	"Honor Is All" (The Dragons of Krynn)	1994			
Renshai Chronicles 4	Beyond Ragnarok	1995			
Short story	"Shadow Storm" (Superheroes)	1995			
Short story	"The Night of Howling" (Werewolves)	1995			
Short story	"Who Killed Humpty Dumpty?" (Fantastic Alice)	1995			
Renshai Chronicles 5	Prince of Demons	1996			
Short story	"Freedom" (Future Net)	1996			
Short story	"Changeling" (Elf Fantastic)	1997			
Short story	"A Herald’s Honor" (Sword of Ice and Other Tales of Valdemar)	1997			
Short story	"Capricorn Blues" (Zodiac Fantastic)	1997			
Short story	"The Bane of Trigeminy" (Wizard Fantastic)	1997			
Renshai Chronicles 6	The Children of Wrath	1998			
Novel	Spirit Fox	1998		With Jennifer Wingert	
Short story	"The Road to Vengeance" (Warrior Princesses)	1998			
Short story	"Alaric’s Gift" (Battle Magic)	1998			
Short story	"Cycle of Horror" (Mob Magic)	1998			
Short story	"Kings’ Quest" (Legends: Tales from the Eternal Archives #1)	1999			
The Bifrost Guardians 6	The Bifrost Guardians #1 (Omnibus, 1+2+3)	2000			
The Bifrost Guardians 7	The Bifrost Guardians #2 (Omnibus, 4+5)	2000			
Novel	Flightless Falcon	2000			
Short story	"Curse of the Dellingrs" (Spell Fantastic)	2000			
Beasts of Barakhai 1	The Beasts of Barakhai	2001			
Short story	"Darkness Comes Together" (Assassin Fantastic)	2001			
Short story	"Personals Wishes" (Single White Vampire Seeks Same)	2001			
Short story	"The Sea God’s Servant" (Oceans of Magic)	2001			
Short story	"Every Life Should Have Nine Cats" (A Constellation of Cats)	2001			
Beasts of Barakhai 2	The Lost Dragons of Barakhai	2002			
Short story	"Squire Thorian’s Trial" (Knight Fantastic)	2002			
Short story	"Nightfall’s Promise" (Fantasy: DAW 30th Anniversary)	2002			
Short story	"Devil Drums" (Vengeance Fantastic)	2002			
Short story	"Home Is Where the Hate Is" (Thieves’ World: Turning Points)	2002			
Short story	"Flanking Maneuver" (Apprentice Fantastic)	2002			
Short story	"Let Our People Go" (Pharaoh Fantastic)	2002			
Beasts of Barakhai 3	The Books of Barakhai (Omnibus, 1+2)	2003			
Short story	"A Herald’s Rescue" (Sun In Glory: and Other Tales of Valdemar)	2003			
Legend of Nightfall 2	The Return of Nightfall	2004			
Novel	A Time to Die	2004			
Short story	"All the Virtues" (Sirius: The Dog Star)	2004			
Short story	"Reach for the Sky" (Masters of Fantasy)	2004			
Short story	"Deadly Ritual" (Thieves’ World: Enemies of Fortune; Enemies of Fortune)	2004			
Short story	"Heart’s Desire" (You Bet Your Planet)	2005			
Short story	"Red Star Prophecy" (In the Shadow of Evil)	2005			
Short story	"All the Pigs’ Houses" (Magic Tails)	2005			
Short story	"In His Own Image" (Millennium 3001)	2006			
Short story	"Battle of Wits" (Fantasy Gone Wrong)	2006			
Short story	"Iowa Under Siege" (Army of the Fantastic)	2007			
Short story	"Dreams of Mountain Clover" (Moving Targets and Other Tales of Valdemar)	2008			
Renshai Chronicles 7	Flight of the Renshai	2009			
I, Robot 1	I, Robot: To Protect	2011		Originally Robots and Chaos	
I, Robot 2	I, Robot: To Obey	2013	ISBN 978-0451464828; ISBN 978-0451416889		
Renshai Chronicles 8	Fields of Wrath: A Renshai Novel	2015			
I, Robot 3	I, Robot: To Preserve	2016			
Renshai Chronicles 9	The Immortal Renshai	2018			
