= Forward the Foundation =

Novel by Isaac Asimov

- Cover of the first edition
- Author: Isaac Asimov
- Cover artist: Bob Larkin
- Language: English
- Series: The Foundation Series
- Genre: Science fiction
- Publisher: Doubleday
- Publication date: 1993
- Publication place: United States
- Media type: Print (hardback & paperback)
- Pages: 417
- ISBN: 0-385-24793-1
- OCLC: 29849055
- Preceded by: Prelude to Foundation
- Followed by: Foundation

Forward the Foundation is a novel by American writer Isaac Asimov, published posthumously in 1993. It is the second of two prequels to the Foundation Series. It is written in a format similar to that of the original book, Foundation, composed of chapters with long intervals in between; however, Forward takes place within only one lifetime. Both books were first published as independent short stories in science fiction magazines.

The parallels between Hari Seldon and Isaac Asimov found in this book— the last one written by Asimov before his death— and the focus on Hari Seldon as he grows old and dies, strengthen the idea that Asimov considered Seldon his literary alter ego. Critics such as Josh Wimmer and Alasdair Wilkins have regarded many of the opinions and viewpoints expressed by Seldon in this book as autobiographical. Thus, they say, a detailed reading of Forward the Foundation can shed light on Asimov's inner thoughts at the end of his life.

Like other previous science fiction works by Asimov, the book was a commercial success, becoming a New York Times bestselling work.

== Plot ==
Forward the Foundation continues the chronicles of the life of Hari Seldon, first begun in Prelude to Foundation. The story takes place on Trantor, and begins eight years after the events of Prelude to Foundation. It depicts how Seldon develops his theory of psychohistory from hypothetical concept to practical application, and its application in the Seldon plan.

In the latter years of the reign of Emperor Cleon I, Seldon is dragged into the world of galactic politics by Yugo Amaryl's concern over Seldon's friend Eto Demerzel, known only to Seldon and Dors Venabili as R. Daneel Olivaw. A new political faction threatens Demerzel, and consequently the fate of the Galactic Empire. In the aftermath Demerzel steps down as First Minister, vanishing to attend to other matters in the galaxy. Cleon appoints Seldon, somewhat unwilling, as the new First Minister. After a ten-year period of relative silence on Trantor, the remains of the political faction exploit Trantor's faults in an attempted coup. As a result, the emperor is assassinated, and a military junta takes over for a disastrous decade. Seldon steps down from his government position and resumes leadership of the psychohistory project.

Seldon and others, most notably Yugo Amaryl, finally develop psychohistory to the point that he can initiate what will come to be known as the Seldon Plan, the road map for drastically shortening the interregnum between the First and Second Empires.

Gradually, Seldon loses all those who are close to him. Seldon's consort Dors is killed (or rather destroyed) in an internal plot by an ambitious member of Seldon's own group. His adopted son Raych emigrates with his wife and younger daughter to Santanni, though his elder daughter Wanda remains with Seldon. When a rebellion against the Empire breaks out, Raych sends his wife and younger daughter away on a starship, but he remains behind to defend his university and is killed, and the starship is never seen again. Yugo Amaryl, the second best psychohistory researcher (after Seldon himself), dies in middle age, worn out by his work. Except for his granddaughter Wanda, Seldon is alone in his fight to keep the project going in the face of the Galactic Empire's accelerating decline and lessening government support.

Wanda turns out to be what Seldon calls a "mentalic": someone who can read minds and actually influence people. (Seldon suspects that her father Raych's great likeability is a subconscious use of the same power.) They are able to find a few other mentalics, enabling Seldon to set up a second guardian for the Seldon Plan. Eventually, he secludes Wanda and the others to establish the Second Foundation in secret, which later turns out to be at the same Imperial Library of Trantor. While the public First Foundation concentrates on the physical sciences, the hidden Second's psychohistorians will develop the mental ones by "scholars."

== Characters ==
Below is a list of all the major and minor characters in the book, in order of appearance, with brief descriptions.

- Hari Seldon, head of the Mathematics Department at Streeling University.
- Wanda, Hari's granddaughter.
- Eto Demerzel, First Minister to the Emperor.
- Yugo Amaryl, psychohistorian.
- Laskin (Jo-Jo) Joranum; politician & demagogue.
- Gambol Deen Namarti, Joranum's right-hand man.
- Dors (Venabili) Seldon, Hari's wife and protector.
- Raych Seldon, Hari's adopted son.
