= The Best of Science Fiction =

1946 anthology edited by Groff Conklin

- Cover ofbthe first edition.
- Editor: Groff Conklin
- Cover artist: Robert Josephy
- Language: English
- Genre: Science fiction
- Publisher: Crown Publishers
- Publication date: 1946
- Publication place: United States
- Media type: Print (hardcover)
- Pages: 785

The Best of Science Fiction, published in 1946, is an anthology of science fiction anthologies edited by American critic and editor Groff Conklin.

== Contents ==
- "Concerning Science Fiction," an essay by John W. Campbell
- Introduction by Groff Conklin
- "Solution Unsatisfactory" (1941) by Robert A. Heinlein, credited as Anson MacDonald
- "The Great War Syndicate" (abridged) (1888) by Frank R. Stockton
- "The Piper's Son" (1945) by Henry Kuttner and C. L. Moore, credited as Lewis Padgett
- "Deadline" (1944) by Cleve Cartmill
- "Lobby" (1944) by Clifford D. Simak
- "Blowups Happen" (1940) by Robert A. Heinlein, credited as Anson MacDonald
- "Atomic Power" (1934) by John W. Campbell, credited as Don A. Stuart
- "Killdozer!" (1944) by Theodore Sturgeon
- "Davey Jones' Ambassador" (1935) by Raymond Z. Gallun
- "Giant in the Earth" (1933) by Morrison Colladay
- "Goldfish Bowl" (1942) by Robert A. Heinlein, credited as Anson MacDonald
- "The Ivy War" (1930) by David H. Keller
- "Liquid Life" (1936) by Ralph Milne Farley
- "A Tale of the Ragged Mountains" (1844) by Edgar Allan Poe
- "The Great Keinplatz Experiment" (1885) by Arthur Conan Doyle
- "The Remarkable Case of Davidson's Eyes" (1895) by H. G. Wells
- "The Tissue-Culture King" (1926) by Julian Huxley
- "The Ultimate Catalyst" (1939) by Eric Temple Bell, credited as John Taine
- "The Terrible Sense" (1938) by Thomas Calvert McClary, credited as Calvin Peregoy
- "A Scientist Divides" (1934) by Donald Wandrei
- "Tricky Tonnage" (1944) by Malcolm Jameson
- "The Lanson Screen" (1936) by Arthur Leo Zagat
- "The Ultimate Metal" (1935) by Nat Schachner
- "The Machine" (1935) by John W. Campbell, credited as Don A. Stuart
- "Short-Circuited Probability" (1941) by Norman L. Knight
- "The Search" (1942) by A. E. van Vogt
- "The Upper Level Road" (1935) by F. Orlin Tremaine, credited as Warner Van Lorne
- "The 32nd of May" (1935) by Paul Ernst
- "The Monster from Nowhere" (1939) by Nelson S. Bond
- "First Contact" (1945) by Murray Leinster
- "Universe" (1941) by Robert A. Heinlein
- "Blind Alley" (1945) by Isaac Asimov
- "En Route to Pluto" (1936) by Wallace West
- "The Retreat to Mars" (1927) by Cecil B. White
- "The Man Who Saved the Earth" (1919) by Austin Hall
- "Spawn of the Stars" (1930) by Charles Willard Diffin
- "The Flame Midget" (1936) by Frank Belknap Long
- "Expedition" (1943) by Anthony Boucher
- "The Conquest of Gola" (1931) by Leslie F. Stone
- "Jackdaw" (1942) by Ross Rocklynne
