= The End of Eternity =

1955 science fiction novel by Isaac Asimov

- Cover of the first edition
- Author: Isaac Asimov
- Cover artist: Mel Hunter
- Language: English
- Genre: Science fiction
- Publisher: Doubleday
- Publication date: 1955
- Publication place: United States
- Media type: Print (Hardcover and Paperback)
- Pages: 191

The End of Eternity is a 1955 science fiction novel by Isaac Asimov with mystery and thriller elements on the subjects of time travel and social engineering. Its ultimate premise is that of a causal loop, a type of temporal paradox in which events and their causes form a loop. The novel was shortlisted for the Hugo Award for Best Novel.

In The End of Eternity, members of a time-changing organization called Eternity, known as "Eternals", seek to ensure that the conditions that led to Eternity's founding occur as history says that they occurred. At the end of the novel, the protagonist Andrew Harlan is placed in a situation in which he must decide whether to allow the "circle" to close and Eternity to be founded, or to allow the opposite to happen and prevent Eternity from having ever existed.

Many years later, Asimov tied this novel into his broader Foundation Series by hinting in Foundation's Edge that it is set in a universe where Eternity had existed, but was destroyed by Eternals, leading to an all-human galaxy. In the last chapter of The End of Eternity, Noÿs mentions hopes of a Galactic Empire.

== Plot ==
In the future, humanity uses time travel to create Eternity, an organization "outside time" that aimed to improve human happiness by observing human history and, after careful analysis, directly making small actions that cause "reality changes". It also established trade between the various centuries to help those most in need. Its members, known as "Eternals", prioritize the reduction of human suffering at the cost of a loss to technology, art, and other endeavors, which are prevented from existing as a consequence of reality changes. Those enlisted travel "upwhen" and "downwhen" and re-enter time in devices called "kettles". They are unable to travel to times before the 27th century, when the temporal field powering Eternity was established, the limit being known as the "downwhen terminus". Also, the future of humanity's fate is unknown since Earth is empty by the year 15 million (the 150,000th century, or the 15,000th millennium), but that is preceded by a period called the Hidden Centuries, or the Void Millennia, from the years 7 million to 15 million (the 70,000th to the 150,000th centuries or 7,000th to the 15,000th millennia) in which, for unknown reasons, they cannot access the world outside Eternity to learn more.

Andrew Harlan is an Eternal and an outstanding Technician, a specialist at implementing reality changes, who is fascinated by the Primitive times before the downwhen terminus. Senior Computer Laban Twissell, the Dean of the Allwhen Council, instructs Harlan to teach a newcomer, Brinsley Sheridan Cooper, about the Primitive. Meanwhile, Harlan is also tasked by Assistant Computer Finge to spend a week in the 482nd century. He stays with Noÿs Lambent, a non-Eternal member of the period's aristocracy and falls in love with her. However, he discovers that a reality change will affect the century, and wishing to preserve Noÿs as she is, he breaks Eternal law, removes her from time, and hides her in the empty sections of Eternity that exist in the Hidden Centuries.

Harlan later finds that the kettles will not travel to the time in which he hid Noÿs because of a mysterious block at the 100,000th century (the year 10 million). He confronts Finge with a weapon and accuses him of sabotaging matters out of jealousy, but Finge states that he reported Harlan's conduct and denies placing the block. Harlan is summoned to the council but is not reprimanded. He deduces that because his transgressions were ignored, he must be there to serve a larger purpose. Harlan confronts Twissell and explains that he has been teaching himself temporal mathematics and believes that its 23rd-century inventor, Vikkor Mallansohn, must have been helped in his discovery by someone from his future. He concludes that his current role is training Cooper to do so. Twissell confirms that and adds that unknown to Cooper, Mallansohn's secret memoirs show that Cooper is the famous inventor Mallansohn. That must be kept from Cooper so that Eternity will be founded as it historically was. Harlan blackmails Twissell by threatening to destroy Cooper's ignorance unless Noÿs is returned, but he is outwitted. Twissell locks him in the control room with all controls deactivated other than the lever to send Cooper back, which matches the memoirs' statement that to have been there was his role. Harlan, enraged, breaks open the controls and changes the power output, which causes Cooper to be sent back to an unknown time, estimated to be in the early 20th century.

Twissell is aghast, but as Eternity still exists, he theorizes that it is possible to undo Harlan's damage and send Cooper back correctly for his mission. They think that Cooper might try to communicate by using an advertisement in one of Harlan's Primitive magazines, which would stand out only to an Eternal. Harlan finds that a magazine from 1932 has changed and now shows an advertisement in the form of a mushroom cloud, which no human could have known of in 1932. The first letters in the ad's four lines, "All the Talk Of the Market", spell out ATOM. However, Harlan refuses to tell Twissell about the advertisement until they bring Noÿs back from the Hidden Centuries, but Twissell insists that the block that Harlan encountered is theoretically impossible. As the two travel far upwhen to get her, Twissell speculates that the Hidden Centuries are a time in which humans evolved into something greater, do not want to be meddled with, and so blocked off Eternity's access to time from the 70,000th to the 150,000th century. He supposes that when Harlan inhabited an Eternity outpost in the Hidden Centuries with Noÿs, those future humans may have worried that Eternity was beginning an invasion, which led them to retaliate with a kettle block at the 100,000th century to prevent any more encroachments. However, Harlan and Twissell pass the 100,000th century unhindered and find Noÿs. Harlan then agrees to travel downwhen and to bring back Cooper so that he can be sent to the correct time for his mission, but only if Noÿs comes with him.

On arrival in 1932, Harlan holds Noÿs at gunpoint and reveals that he suspects her of being from the Hidden Centuries and that he has brought her so that she could not harm Eternity. Noÿs acknowledges that she is from that time and explains that her people have also developed time travel, but their method shows many possible futures, rather than just the single future seen by Eternity. They learned that humans would have been the first species to spread into the galaxy, but in each future in which Eternity existed, safety was given a priority, and by the time that humans had reached the stars, other species predominated and prevented them. As a result, humanity would become depressed and gradually die out. Noÿs's mission was to make the minimum change to history to remedy that by preventing Eternity from ever being founded. There were multiple ways of achieving that, and she chose an approach in which she and Harlan were together. Noÿs gives Harlan the choice of killing her and preserving Eternity or letting her live and allowing a different future to arise. Harlan, remembering the unhealthy interpersonal relationships between the Eternals and the sociological damage that he has seen to be done to people whose original "homewhen" had ceased to exist, agrees with her. His resolution causes a reality change to occur, and the kettle disappears, indicating that Eternity now never happened. The book ends by stating that it was "the end of Eternity – and the beginning of Infinity".

== Concepts ==
- Physio-time: Relative time elapsed as perceived by an Eternal
- Eternity: An organization outside normal time involved in changing history
- Eternals: Member of Eternity. They do not live forever and are recruited as young men from regular time.
- Homewhen: The original time of an Eternal
- Upwhen: Moving forward in time or referring to a relative future
- Downwhen: Moving backward in time or referring to a relative past
- Kettle: Device for moving forward ("upwhen") or backward ("downwhen") in time
- Minimum Necessary Change (M.N.C.): The smallest possible change that will restore or create the desired future (see also Butterfly effect)
- Computer is used in its original sense, person employed to do computations. Electronic devices built to do computations are called computaplexes.

== Major characters ==
- Andrew Harlan: An outstanding Technician, a member of Eternity who is responsible for implementing reality changes. He is appointed as Twissell's personal Technician.
- Laban Twissell: Senior Computer and dean of the Allwhen Council, which is responsible for ensuring the events of Mallansohn's memoirs occur as described.
- Hobbe Finge: Assistant Computer, who greatly dislikes and distrusts Harlan.
- Noÿs Lambent: a human from the Hidden Centuries, who is first introduced as a non-Eternal member of the aristocracy from the 482nd century and is officially Finge's secretary.
- Vikkor Mallansohn / Brinsley Sheridan Cooper (the Cub): Mallansohn develops the Temporal Field in the 24th century which leads to the founding of Eternity in the 27th century.

== Origins ==
In December 1953 Asimov was thumbing through a copy of the 28 March 1932 issue of Time, and noticed what looked, at first glance, like a drawing of the mushroom cloud of a nuclear explosion. A closer look showed him that the drawing was actually a geyser, the Old Faithful. Asimov began pondering the question of what the implications would be if there had been a drawing of a mushroom cloud in a magazine from 1932, and he eventually came up with the plot of a time travel story. He began the story, The End of Eternity, on 7 December 1953, and he finished it on 6 February 1954, when it was 25,000 words long. Asimov submitted the story to Galaxy Science Fiction, and within days, he received a call from Galaxy editor Horace L. Gold that rejected the story. Asimov decided to turn the story into a novel, and on March 17, he left it with Walter I. Bradbury, the science fiction editor at Doubleday, to get his opinion. Bradbury was receptive, and by April 7, Asimov had been informed that a contract for the novel was in the works. Asimov began expanding the story and eventually delivered the novel version to Bradbury on December 13. Doubleday accepted the novel, which was published in August 1955.

The original End of Eternity appeared in 1986 in a collection called The Alternate Asimovs.

== Reception ==
The book was highly acclaimed by critics. The New York Times reviewer Villiers Gerson praised the novel by stating it "has suspense on every page" and "exhibits in every chapter the plot twists for which the author is famous." In a 1972 review, Lester del Rey declared that no one "has wrung so much out of... or has developed all the possibilities of paradox."

As noted by the critic Susan Young, John Crowley's award-winning 1989 novella "Great Work of Time" has the same basic outline as The End of Eternity, a secret society of well-meaning time travelers bent on remodeling history and a young man recruited into the society to make a specific change that would bring the society itself into being. The details of what the time travelers do and when in time they operate are very different from those in Asimov's book. However, in both books, the society's operations come to a halt through the influence of people from the future for reasons that have to do with the existence of that future. Young also notes a similarity with Poul Anderson's The Corridors of Time, which also depicts a complex society of time travelers who find sections of the future inaccessible; also in Anderson's book, the intervention of the people of that further future plays a pivotal and cataclysmic role in the plot.

Charles Stross has stated that his 2009 novella Palimpsest is effectively a rewrite of The End of Eternity.

== Role in Foundation series ==
The End of Eternity suggests that the new reality is the one that leads to the Galactic Empire and Foundation but does not confirm it. The "neuronic whip" from The Currents of Space and other stories in the "Empire" future is also found in The End of Eternity, as something that had to be removed from reality. The original unpublished End of Eternity is clearly a different future from that of the Foundation, but Asimov says in his story-postscript that he had some idea of a bridge in the published version.

Asimov placed a hint in Foundation's Edge, many years later, that the Eternals might have been responsible for the all-human galaxy and the development of humanity on Earth of the Foundation Series, but that interpretation is disputed. Asimov himself mentions the disparity. The human-like robots may have been intended to play a part.

According to Alasdair Wilkins, in a discussion published on Gizmodo, "Asimov absolutely loves weird, elliptical structures. All three of his non-robot/Foundation science fiction novels — The End of Eternity, The Gods Themselves, and Nemesis — leaned heavily on non-chronological narratives, and he does it with gusto in The Gods Themselves."

== Translations ==
The End of Eternity has been translated into over 25 languages. The Russian translation, first edition 1966, was heavily censored because of both sexual references and sociological discussions that were unacceptable to Soviet ideology.

For some time, The End of Eternity was out of print, but that was remedied with Tor Books' 2011 hardcover reissue and a recent move to various e-book formats.

== Adaptations ==
- A halhatatlanság halála (1977), a TV movie directed by András Rajnai
  A television film based on the book, entitled A halhatatlanság halála (literally The Death of Immortality) was made in Hungary in 1976. The screenwriter and director was András Rajnai, and the main character was played by Jácint Juhász.
- The End of Eternity (1987), a film directed by Andrei Yermash
  It mostly follows the novel except for the ending.
  The novel ends with both Noÿs and Harlan deciding that the suppression of spaceflight by Eternity is not in the interest of humankind, and they live "happily ever after."
  In the Soviet film, the ending takes place in the mid-1980s Munich in Germany at the Hypo-Haus, rather than 1932 Los Angeles. Noÿs never fully describes why she wants Eternity destroyed, but in the middle of the movie, before her true identity is revealed, she gives some idea. Harlan yells at her that he is but a pawn in things and storms off, and there is a strong implication that he and Noÿs have no further contact. Then, a scene shows Harlan observing both Twissell and Finge in 1980s clothing getting out of a Rolls-Royce and walking together. The implication is that Twissel and Finge use Harlan as a pawn to further their own materialistic gains.
  While out of step with the rest of the film as well as the novel, the ending follows the Soviet concept that the "everyman" (Harlan) is frequently manipulated by the bourgeoisie as a pawn to its own ends. The film ends with a long shot of Harlan walking away alone from the camera down a highway.
- Loki (TV series) (2021), Marvel Cinematic Universe, Michael Waldron
  Though it's a different story, the television series written by Michael Waldron heavily borrowed ideas such as:
  - the bureaucratic structure of Eternity (renamed to TVA)
  - preserving a single Reality (renamed to The Sacred Timeline)
  - TVA agents are people removed from pruned timelines
  - the very existence of TVA is paradoxical in nature, as it was created using information that was sent back in time from TVA

In 2008, New Regency acquired the rights to the novel for a possible film adaptation.

== Sources ==
- Tuck, Donald H. (1974). The Encyclopedia of Science Fiction and Fantasy. Chicago: Advent. p. 21. ISBN 0-911682-20-1.
