= Foundation's Edge =

1982 novel by Isaac Asimov

- Cover of first edition (hardcover)
- Author: Isaac Asimov
- Cover artist: Joe Caroff
- Language: English
- Series: Foundation Series
- Genre: Science fiction
- Published: June 1, 1982 (Doubleday)
- Publication place: United States
- Media type: Print (Hardcover, Paperback)
- Pages: 367
- Awards: Hugo Award for Best Novel (1983); Locus Award for Best Science Fiction Novel (1983)
- ISBN: 0-385-17725-9
- OCLC: 8473906
- Dewey Decimal: 813/.54 19
- LC Class: PS3551.S5 F6 1982
- Preceded by: Second Foundation
- Followed by: Foundation and Earth

Foundation's Edge (1982) is a science fiction novel by American writer Isaac Asimov, the fourth book in the Foundation Series. It was written more than thirty years after the stories of the original Foundation trilogy, due to years of pressure by fans and editors on Asimov to write another, and, according to Asimov himself, the amount of the payment offered by the publisher. It was his first novel to ever land on The New York Times best-seller list, after 262 books and 44 years of writing.

== Plot summary ==
Five hundred years after the establishment of the Foundation, the Mayor of Terminus, Harla Branno, is basking in a political glow, her policies having been vindicated by the recent successful resolution of a Seldon Crisis. Golan Trevize, a former officer of the Navy and now a member of Council, believes the Second Foundation, which is almost universally thought to be extinct, still exists and is controlling events. He attempts to question the continued existence of the Seldon Plan during a Council session, but Branno has him arrested on a charge of treason. Branno also believes that the Second Foundation still exists and is in control, but she cannot admit it publicly for political reasons, and treats that as a state secret, hence her alarm and her swift action.

So, she orders Trevize to leave Terminus to search for the Second Foundation. As a cover, he is to be accompanied by Janov Pelorat, a professor of Ancient History and mythologist, who is interested in the location of Earth, the fabled original world of the human species. They are provided a highly advanced computer-controlled "gravitic" ship to carry out their mission. Branno also sends out Munn Li Compor in another similar vessel to follow and monitor Trevize.

Indeed, the Second Foundation still does exist, but rather than being in complete control, as the First Foundation fears, it has similar worries. On Trantor, home of the Second Foundation, Stor Gendibal, a rising intellect in the Second Foundation hierarchy, reveals to Quindor Shandess, the current First Speaker, his finding that the Seldon Plan, which the Second Foundation diligently protects and furthers along, is being manipulated by some unknown group, probably more powerful than the Second Foundation, with unknown motivations. Shandess dubs this group the "Anti-Mules", as they seem to possess powers similar to the Mule, but to be using them not to destroy the Seldon Plan, as the Mule had tried to do, but rather to preserve it.

At first, Gendibal's ideas are very badly received by the other Speakers, with Shandess alone supporting him, and he is threatened with expulsion, but the Speakers' resistance is overcome when Gendibal demonstrates that the brain of Sura Novi, a member of the Hamish, the rude people of farmers who inhabit and cultivate Trantor, shows a subtle change to her mind that would be far beyond the Second Foundation's capabilities to make, and could only have been made by a much more powerful entity, probably the "Anti-Mules". Gendibal and Novi are sent out on a spaceship to track Trevize and determine the goals of the "Anti-Mules".

Meanwhile, Trevize and Pelorat engage in the latter's project to locate Earth, but there is no planet with that name in the galactic table of planets, and none with its exact predicted characteristics either. However, Pelorat mentions having heard of a planet called Gaia, whose name he somehow discovered to mean Earth in some ancient language. Its coordinates are unknown, but it is supposed to be somewhere in the Sayshell Sector. Trevize decides that they must go there to follow up on this lead. On the Sayshell main planet, Trevize and Pelorat meet a scholar, Professor Quintesetz, who is able to reluctantly give them the coordinates to Gaia. They travel there and discover that Gaia is a "superorganism" where all things, both living and inanimate, participate in a larger group consciousness, while still retaining any individual awareness they might have. Pelorat slowly falls in love with a Gaian woman named Blissenobiarella, commonly called Bliss.

Gendibal finds Trevize's location with information from Compor, who is secretly a Second Foundation agent. On approaching Gaia, Gendibal is met by a First Foundation warship, commanded by Mayor Branno. As Gendibal's mental powers stalemate with Mayor Branno's force shield, Novi reveals herself as an agent of Gaia. She joins the stalemate and the three are locked until Trevize can join them. Bliss explains to Trevize that he had been led to Gaia so that his untouched mind, which has unique, remarkable powers of intuition, can decide the galaxy's fate — whether it will be ruled by the First Foundation, by the Second Foundation, or by Gaia, which envisions an extension of its group consciousness to the entire galaxy, thus forming the new entity Galaxia. He also learns that the stalemate between the First Foundation (Branno), the Second Foundation (Gendibal), and Gaia (Novi) was intentional, and that through his ship's computer, he can decide who shall ultimately prove victorious.

Trevize decides upon Gaia, and through mental adjustments, Gaia makes Branno and Gendibal believe they have won minor victories, and that Gaia does not exist. But Trevize is troubled by one final missing piece of information: In the course of their investigation, Trevize and Pelorat had found out that all references to Earth had been removed from the Galactic Library at Trantor. Trevize wants to know who did this and why, as Gaia denies having done that. He announces his intention to find Earth, since without knowing the answers to those questions, he cannot be certain his choice was the right one. Trevize also explains that he chose Gaia because that was the only choice of the three that was reversible in case his choice should prove to be wrong, due to the large length of time required for the formation of Galaxia.

== Reception ==
In a 1982 review of the novel, Kirkus Reviews states that "after a slowish start, then, the rather talky narrative here develops into grippingly effective drama—with oodles of twisty-turny plot, an engaging cast, and some enjoyably mellow humor ... A grandmasterly performance."

Lee Michaels reviewed Foundation's Edge for Pegasus magazine and stated that "This is a must-read for fans of the Foundation trilogy, and, for those who have not read the trilogy, do that first and then read Foundation's Edge. If you simply must read Foundation's Edge first, go ahead and enjoy it, but, like salted peanuts, one won't be enough, and you will just end up reading the books out of sequence. Don't say you weren't warned!"

David Langford reviewed Foundation's Edge for White Dwarf #39, and stated that "At 200,000 words, the sequel seems longer than the original series; endless pages of grey dialogue about the fate of the galaxy are on the whole boring, and the trilogy is weakened, not strengthened, by the addition. For example, the trilogy's goal of peaceful Galactic Empire is now rejected, presumably because of fascist implications: this is all very Politically Correct but converts the first three books to pointless chronicles of misguided effort. Remarkably, it's a US bestseller."

Foundation's Edge won both the Hugo Award for Best Novel in 1983 and the Locus Award for Best Science Fiction Novel in 1983; the book was nominated for the Nebula Award for Best Novel in 1982.

== See also ==
- Our Angry Earth
