= Etto (disambiguation) =

Etto may refer to:

- Etto (born 1981; Oélilton Araújo dos Santos), Brazilian soccer player
- Saint Etto (died 660); see Chronological list of saints in the 7th century
- etto (unit), a Sumatran traditional unit of measurement for length; see Indonesian units of measurement
- etto- (prefix), a non-standard metric prefix for 10^{2}
- -etto (suffix), an Italian language suffix for creating an Italian name using Italian grammar diminutive creation; see List of diminutives by language
- Etto principle, the efficiency–thoroughness trade-off principle]

== See also ==
- EETO
- Etoo (disambiguation)
- ETO (disambiguation)
- Etta (disambiguation)
- Ette (disambiguation)
- Etty (disambiguation), including Etti
