= Etta =

Etta may refer to:

== Places in the United States ==
- Etta, Mississippi, an unincorporated community
- Etta, Oklahoma, a census-designated place
- Etta, South Dakota, a ghost town
- Etta, Virginia, an unincorporated community

== Other uses ==
- Etta (name), a list of people and fictional characters with the given name, nickname or stage name
- ETTA, an abbreviation for the English Table Tennis Association, now Table Tennis England

== See also ==
- ETA (disambiguation)
- Ette (disambiguation)
- Etty and Etti, a surname and given name
