= Gravely =

Gravely may refer to:

- Gravely Tractor, a manufacturer of outdoor power lawn and garden implements
- USS Gravely (DDG-107), an Arleigh Burke-class guided missile destroyer

People with the surname Gravely:

- Etta C. Gravely (born 1939), American chemistry academic
- Frederic Henry Gravely (1885–1965), English entomologist
- Joseph J. Gravely (1828–1872), American politician
- Samuel L. Gravely, Jr. (1922–2004), African American Navy pioneer
- Tracy Gravely (born 1968), Canadian football player

== See also ==
- Graveley (disambiguation)
