= Etta (name) =

Etta is an English given name that is a diminutive form of Antonietta, Henrietta and other names that end in “-etta”. Etta is also a Danish, Finnish, Norwegian, Old Danish, Old Swedish and Swedish given name. Notable people with this name include the following:

== Given name ==
- Etta Baker (1913–2006), American musician
- Etta Moten Barnett (1901–2004), American actress and singer
- Etta Deikman (fl. 1950s –) American artist
- Etta Zuber Falconer (1933–2002), American educator
- Etta Federn (1883–1951), Austrian writer
- Etta C. Gravely (born 1939), American chemistry academic
- Etta Hulme (1923–2014), American cartoonist
- Etta Jones (1928–2001), American singer
- Etta Lee (1906–1956), American actress
- Etta Belle Lloyd (1860–1929), American pioneer
- Etta Wedell Mastbaum (1866–1953), American executive
- Etta May, American comedian
- Etta McDaniel (1890–1946), American actress
- Etta Murfitt (born 1966), British dancer and choreographer
- Etta Neumann, Austrian table tennis player
- Etta Palm d'Aelders (1743–1799), Dutch feminist
- Etta D. Pisano, American radiologist
- Etta Place (c. 1878 – ?), American Butch Cassidy's Wild Bunch associate
- Etta Riel (born 1914 missing since 1934), American woman who disappeared from Worcester, Massachusetts
- Etta Scollo (born 1958), Italian singer and songwriter
- Etta Semple, birthname Martha Etta Donaldson, née Martha Etta Kilmer (1854–1914), American activist
- Etta Angell Wheeler (1834–1921), American child advocate
- Etta Wriedt (1859–1942), American medium

== Nickname or stage name ==
- Etta Banda (born 1949), Malawian politician
- Etta Bond (born 1989), nickname of Henrietta Bond, British singer-songwriter
- Etta Britt, birthname Melissa Prewitt, (born 1958/1959), American vocalist
- Etta Cameron, birthname Ettamae Louvita Coakley, (1939–2010), Bahamian singer
- Etta Hawkins, stage name of Henrietta Luna Hawkins (1865–1945), American actress
- Etta James, birthname Jamesetta Hawkins (1938–2012), American singer
- Margaretta Louisa Lemon (1860–1953), British conservationist
- Etta Haynie Maddox, (1860–1933), American vocalist, lawyer and suffragist
- Etta Rosales (fl. 1998–2015), Filipino politician
- Etta (rapper), real name Emmalotta Kanth, Finnish musician

== Fictional characters ==
- Etta Candy, Wonder Woman's best friend in the DC Comics universe
- Etta, Gunslinger Girl character
- Etta, Realm of the Elderlings character
- Etta Kett (fl. 1925 – 1974), Comic strip (and comic strip character) focused on teenage etiquette
- Etta Tavernier, EastEnders character played by Jacqui Gordon-Lawrence
- Etta Place, companion of Harry Longabagh (AKA the Sundance Kid)

== See also ==
- Etta (disambiguation)
- Eta (given name)
- Amba Etta-Tawo (born 1993), Omani gridiron football player
