= Yeta =

Yeta may refer to:

- Yeta, an element of Argentine tango
- Port Lihou Island, or Yeta, an island in the Torres Strait
- Yeta I, High Chief of the Lozi people in Barotseland, Africa
  - Yeta II Nalute
  - Yeta III

== See also ==
- Eta (disambiguation)
