= Two-wheel tractor =

Tractor with only one axle

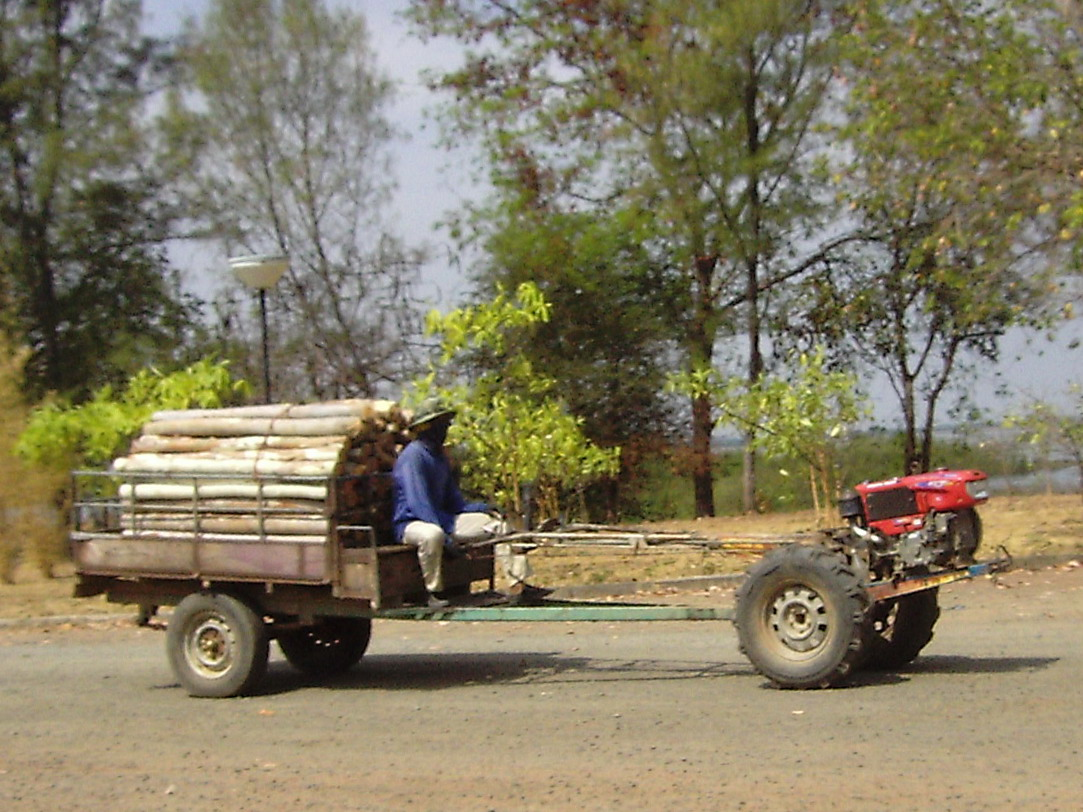
A Rot-E-Taek hauling logs in Isan, Thailand. This is one of many types of two-wheel tractor.

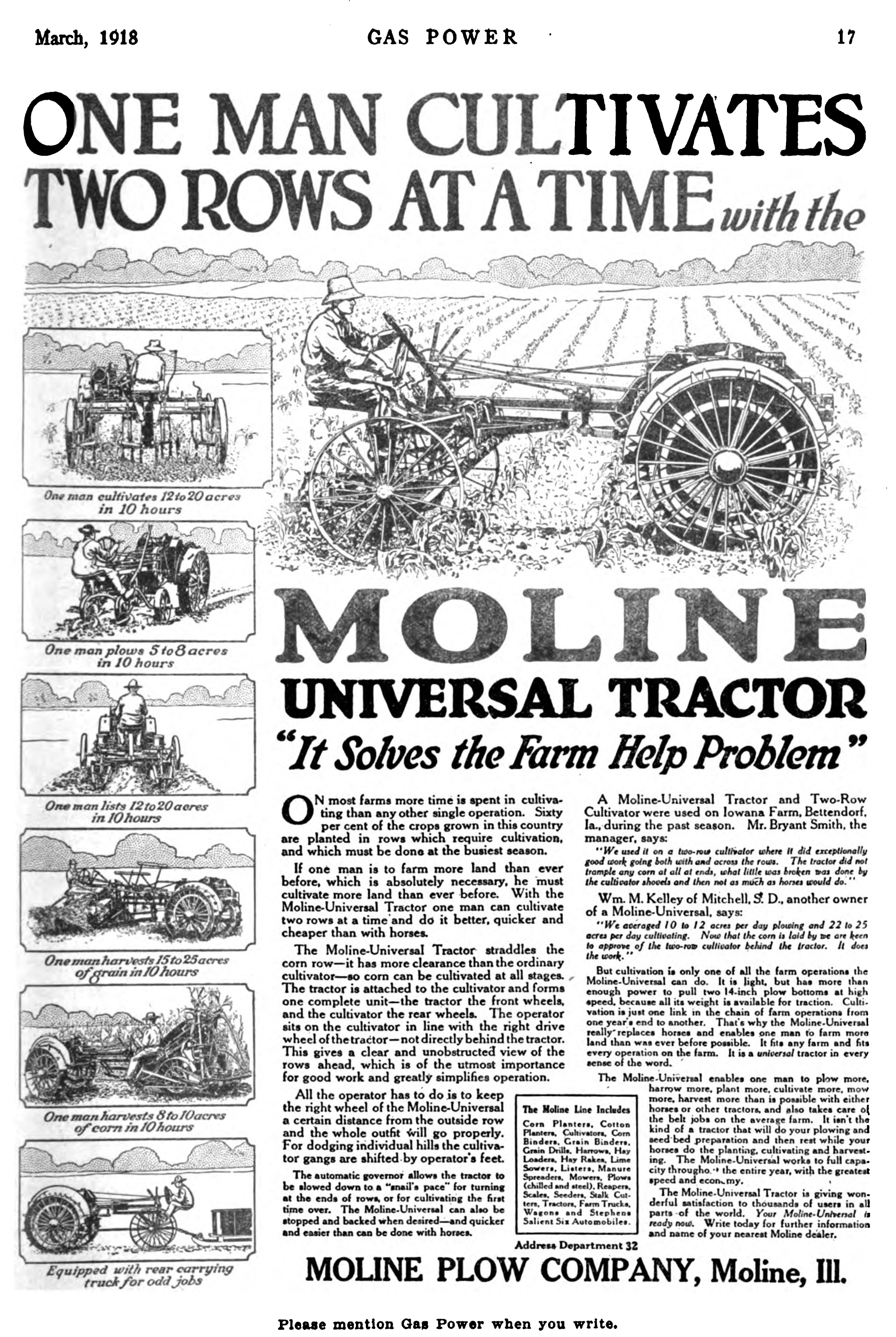
Moline Universal Tractor advertisement, 1918. Like many two-wheel tractors, this tractor together with its towed implement formed a four-wheel articulated unit, with the operator riding the implement.

Two-wheel tractor or walking tractor (French: motoculteur, Russian: мотоблок (motoblok), German: Einachsschlepper) are generic terms understood in the US and in parts of Europe to represent a single-axle tractor, which is a tractor with one axle, self-powered and self-propelled, which can pull and power various farm implements such as a trailer, cultivator or harrow, a plough, or various seeders and harvesters. The operator usually walks behind it or rides the implement being towed. Similar terms are mistakenly applied to the household rotary tiller or power tiller; although these may be wheeled and/or self-propelled, they are not tailored for towing implements. A two-wheeled tractor specializes in pulling any of numerous types of implements, whereas rotary tillers specialize in soil tillage with their dedicated digging tools. This article concerns two-wheeled tractors as distinguished from such tillers.

== Definition ==
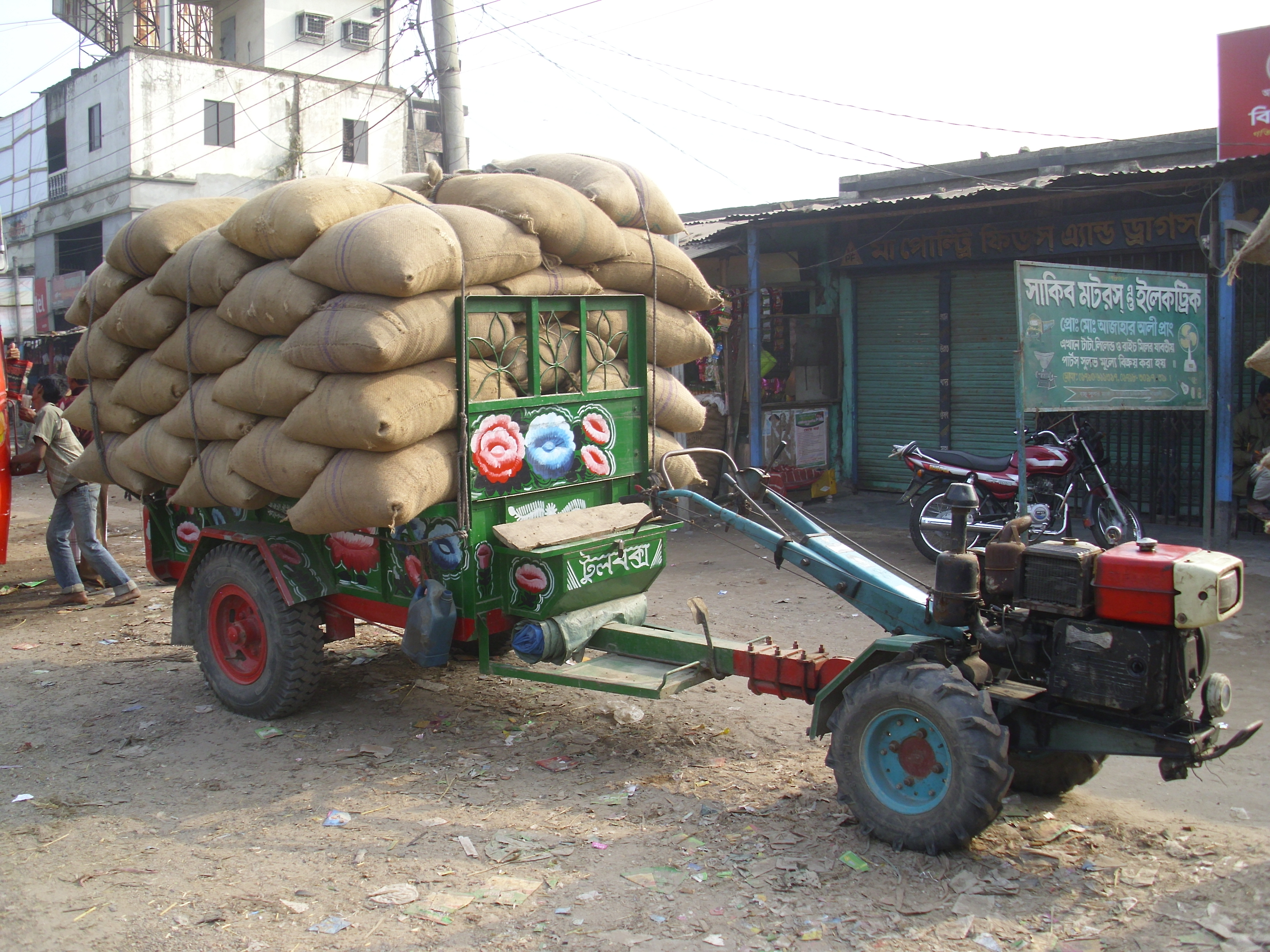
Sifeng Model 12 HP 2WT with 5.6 tonnes of rice, Bangladesh

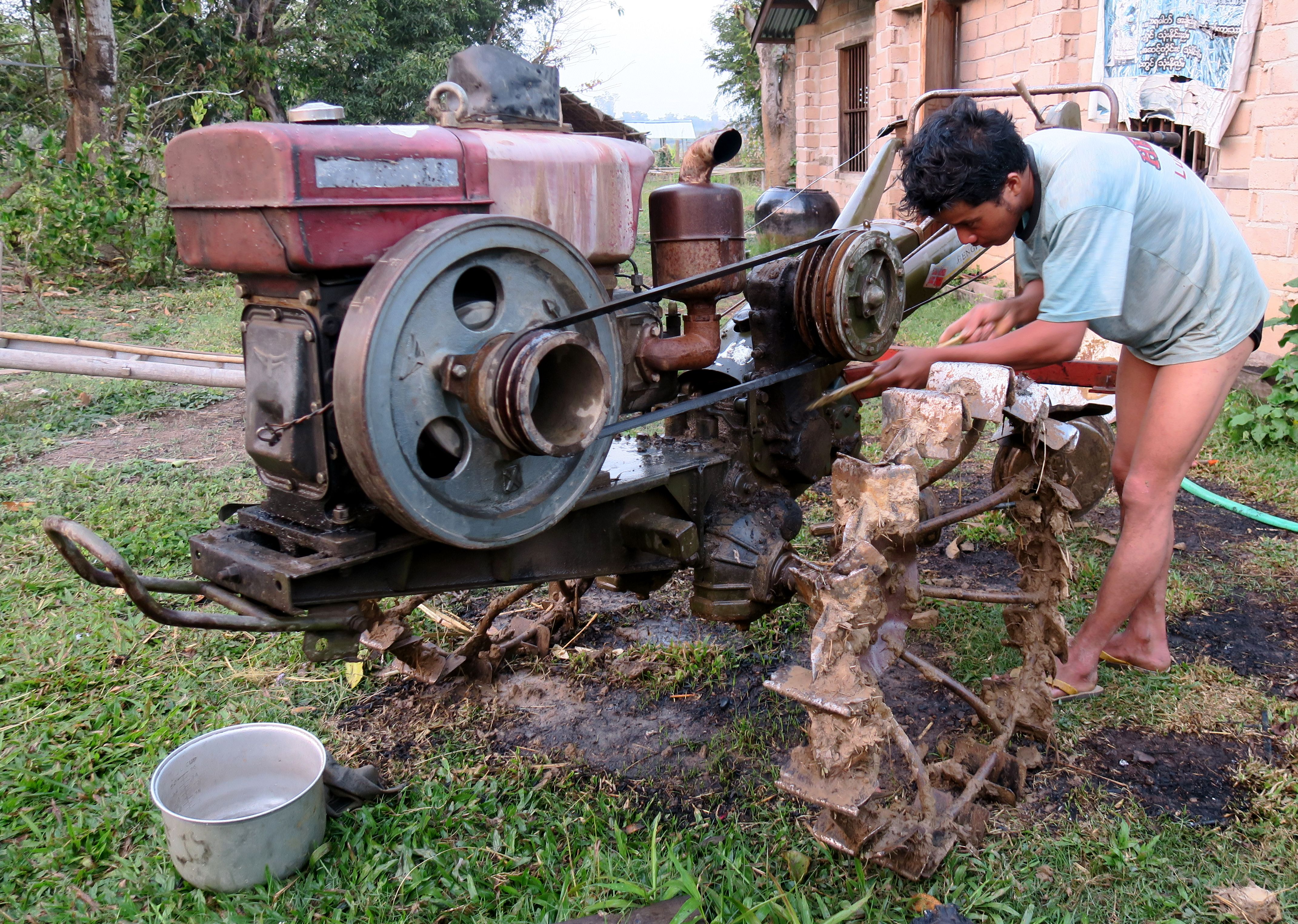
A Changzhou Hengfeng Two-wheel tractor ('Walking Tractor') in Hsipaw (Myanmar).

Research has identified several terms used to identify the two-wheel tractor including: "walk-behind tractor, iron-ox, walking tractor, mechanical ox, ox-machine, pedestrian tractor, hand tractor, single-axle tractor, and in Asia, tok-tok".

There is also a bit of confusion in the nomenclature regarding machines with similar size or configuration, that operate a single implement (such as power tillers, rear-tine tillers, rotary hoes, rotary ploughs, rotary tillers and rotavators etc.).

The important distinction between a two-wheel tractor and any of these machines is that the two-wheel tractor is a single-axle machine where the operator usually walks behind it or rides the implement being towed and is designed to operate multiple interchangeable implements.

On the hand, the machines in the other categories above typically only operate one implement (such as a tiller) which is often an integral part of the machine (rather than being removable).

The "power tiller" can be understood as a garden tiller or rototiller of the small (3–7 hp or 2.2–5.2 kW) petrol/gasoline/electric powered, hobby gardener variety; that are often sold as a rotary tiller, though the technical agricultural use of that term refers solely to an attachment to a larger tractor.

Alternatively, the term "power tiller" or "rotary tiller" as is understood in Asia and elsewhere is the rubber- or iron-wheeled, self-propelled machines of 5–18 hp (3.7–13.4 kW) usually powered by heavy-duty single-cylinder diesel engines (and many Asian countries historically have had to pay a high luxury tax on petrol/gasoline).

Adding to the nomenclature confusion, agricultural engineers like to classify them as the single-axle tractor. For clarity, the rest of this article refers to the self-propelled, single-axle, multi-attachment tractive machines called the two-wheel tractor.

For agricultural production in the past and in the present, the two-wheel tractor accepts a wide range of implements for soil-working such as the: rototillers, moldboard plow, disc-plow, rotary plow, root/tuber harvesting plow, small subsoiler plow, powered and non-powered harrow, seeders, transplanters, and planters (zero till and no-till planters) and seeders.

In plant protection and weed control, two-wheel tractor implements consist of various inter-cultivators and sprayers. For harvesting forage available two wheel tractor implements are: sickle bar mowers, disk mowers, hay rakes, hay tedders, hay balers and bale wrappers [for silage production].

For grain harvest the available implements are: reaper or grain harvesters, reaper-binders, and even combine harvesters [although typically only for Asian two-wheel tractors].For transport, trailers with capacities from 0.5 to 5 plus ton cargoes are available.

The general mowing implements consist of lawn mowers, brush mowers, and flail mowers and for snow removal the implements consist of snowblowers, power sweepers, and snow or dozer blades. Other implements include: chipper/shredders, log splitters, electrical generator, pressure washer, crimper-roller, fertilizer/salt/lime spreader, and stump grinder.

This list of implements is inexhaustible which means that the two-wheel tractors can execute practically all of the chores done by larger 4-wheel tractors, with the exception of items like front-loaders, which obviously have the physical stability requirements of a 4-wheel (two-axle) tractor.

This confusion over, or perhaps just ignorance of the utility of 2-wheel tractors, persists even at research and institutional levels. The United Nations' Food and Agriculture Organization's own statistical database, FAO Stat gauges levels of agricultural mechanization by numbers of 4-wheel tractors and ignores completely the fact that 2-wheel tractors often perform much, or even exactly, the same work as done by 4-wheeled models. By using FAO's statistics, international donors and agricultural research and development centres assume that as Bangladesh and Sri Lanka have very few 4-wheel tractors, they are completely unmechanized compared to (e.g.) India, which have a large population of them (besides 300,000 two-wheel tractors). Yet, when two-wheel tractors are included, Bangladesh and Sri Lanka are the most highly mechanized countries in south Asia in terms of area farmed using mechanized tillage. Two-wheel tractors are also extremely common for agricultural use in the mountainous countries of Europe (Italy, France, Spain, Germany, Switzerland, Austria, etc.), and as of 2015, there are at least 15 brands of two-wheel tractors of Italian origin alone.

== History by country in chronological order ==
Development of single-axle tractors and power tillers worldwide began in the early 20th century and for many decades involved a mixture of people working independently in local contexts and, in other cases, of people expanding on the inspiration provided by others' work in distant locales, learned about via exports, travel (whether for jobs, business, or military service), or reading (magazines, newspapers, journals). The homegrown instances and the interwoven threads are discussed in subsequent sections.

=== Europe ===
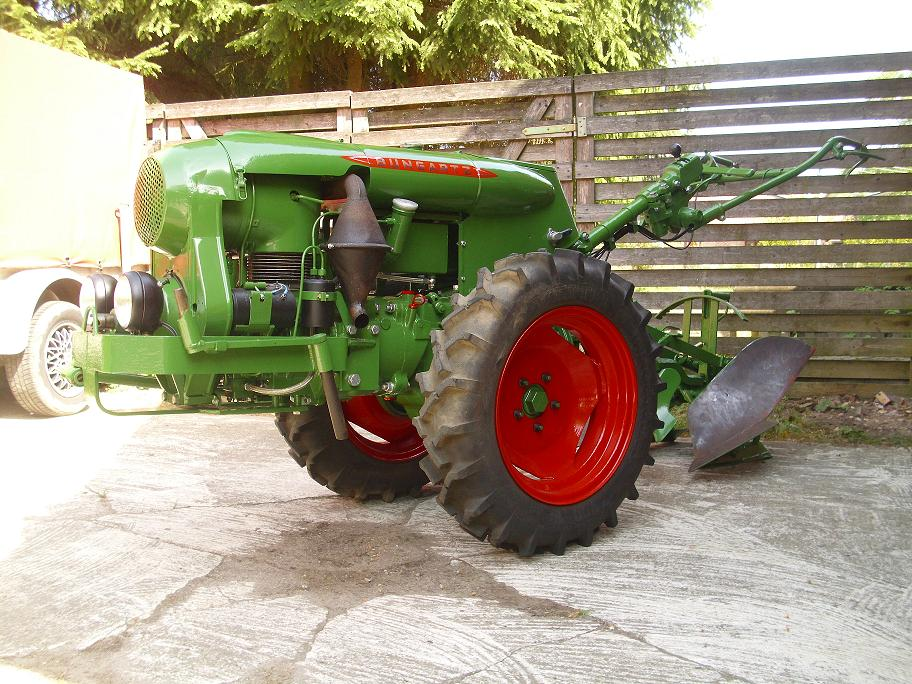
A 1952 Bungartz model U1D walk-behind, showing a moldboard plow attached.

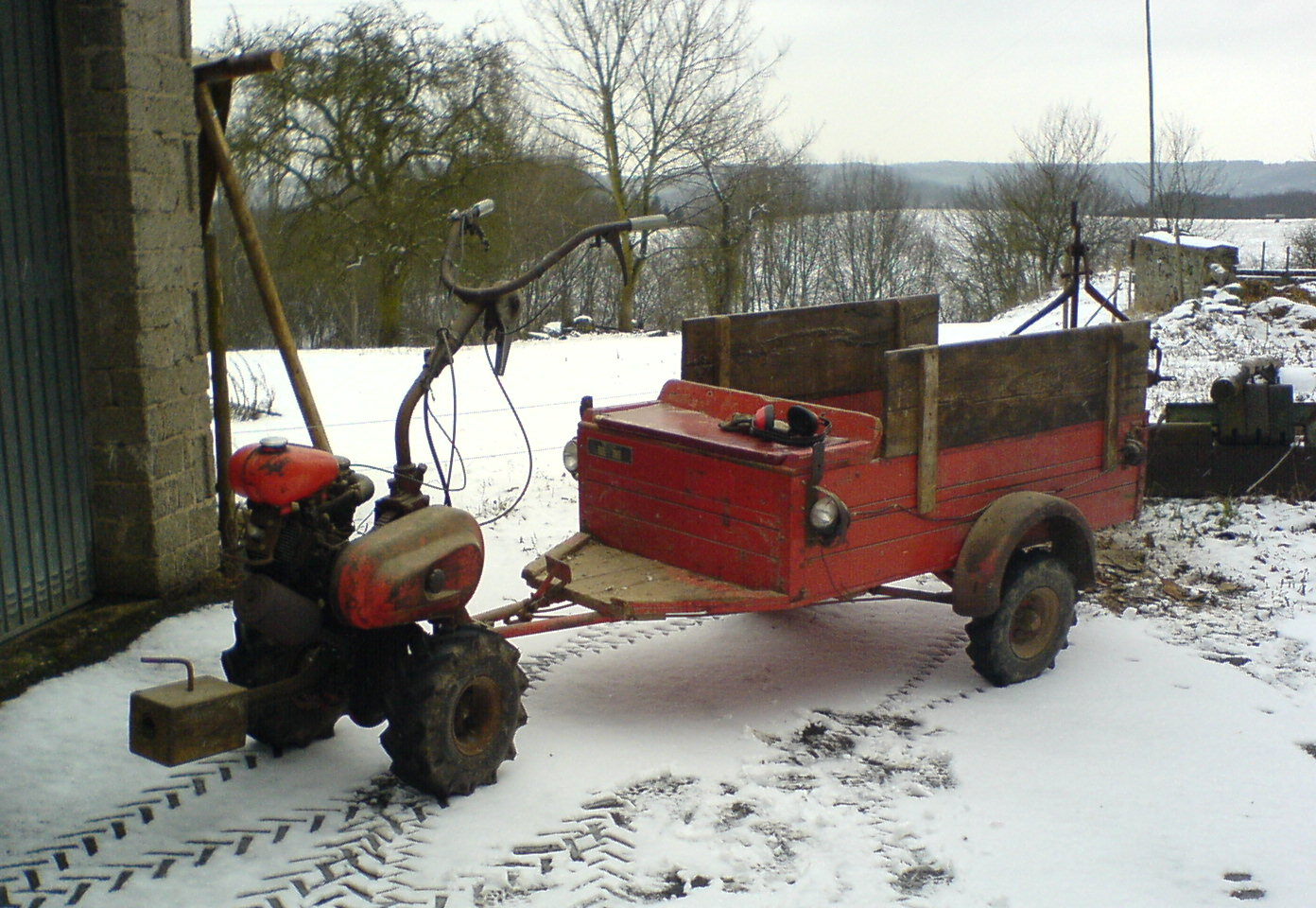
A Hako two-wheel tractor with trailer.

In 1910, Dr. Konrad von Meyenburg of Basel, Switzerland, applied for a patent for a "Machine for Mechanical Tillage". Patent Number 1,018,843 was granted on February 27, 1912. He then licensed his patent to Siemens-Schuckertwerke of Berlin, Germany. Siemens, an electrical manufacturer, built their first two-wheel tractor with rotovator Bodenfräse (rotovator or literally soil grinder) using an electric motorized two-wheel tractor and a long extension cord in 1911. The idea was quickly abandoned and Siemens began using two and four cycle single cylinder internal combustion gasoline/petrol or diesel engines to power their two-wheel tractors. Around 1932 Siemens sold off its cultivator division and focused on its electrical applications. Mr. Eberhard Bungartz of Munich, Germany, a trailer manufacturer, purchased the division in 1934 with all patents, parts, and machinery, and he went into production using the Bungartz name.

The SIMAR Co. (Société Industrielle de Machines Agricoles Rotatives) of Switzerland began development of a similar machine and by 1932 was producing several machines ranging from 2 1/2 to 10 horsepower, with a tilling width of 14" to 36", and weight from 220 to 880 pounds (100 to 400 kg).

Starting after World War II, many countries in Europe started producing two-wheel tractors, most notably Italy. In 2014, Italy had over 15 manufacturers. Starting in the late 1960s and early 1970s, many European two-wheel tractors underwent an "evolution" which sharply contrasted them from the Asian and American machines: The introduction of fully reversible handlebars, allowed the machine's PTO (Power Take Off, where implements are mounted) to be effectively in the front or rear of the tractor, depending on handlebar position. This allowed much safer and more practical operation. Only very recently (since 2005) have any Asian manufacturers added this feature to their machines at all, and the bulk of Asian machines are still produced without this feature. Some two wheel drive tractors can be paired, through the PTO, with a drive axle on trailing equipment, creating a four-wheel drive arrangement for severe conditions.

In France, Somua, a company set up in the mid to late 1800s for making military equipment and later buses and even three wheel tractors, began making "motorculteurs" from the late 1920s till after World War II.

Other manufacturers now out of business were Energic and Labor.

Staub appeared to start making motorculteurs from about 1938 and still in production today. The first rototiller was the PP3. Later there was a PP4.

=== United States ===
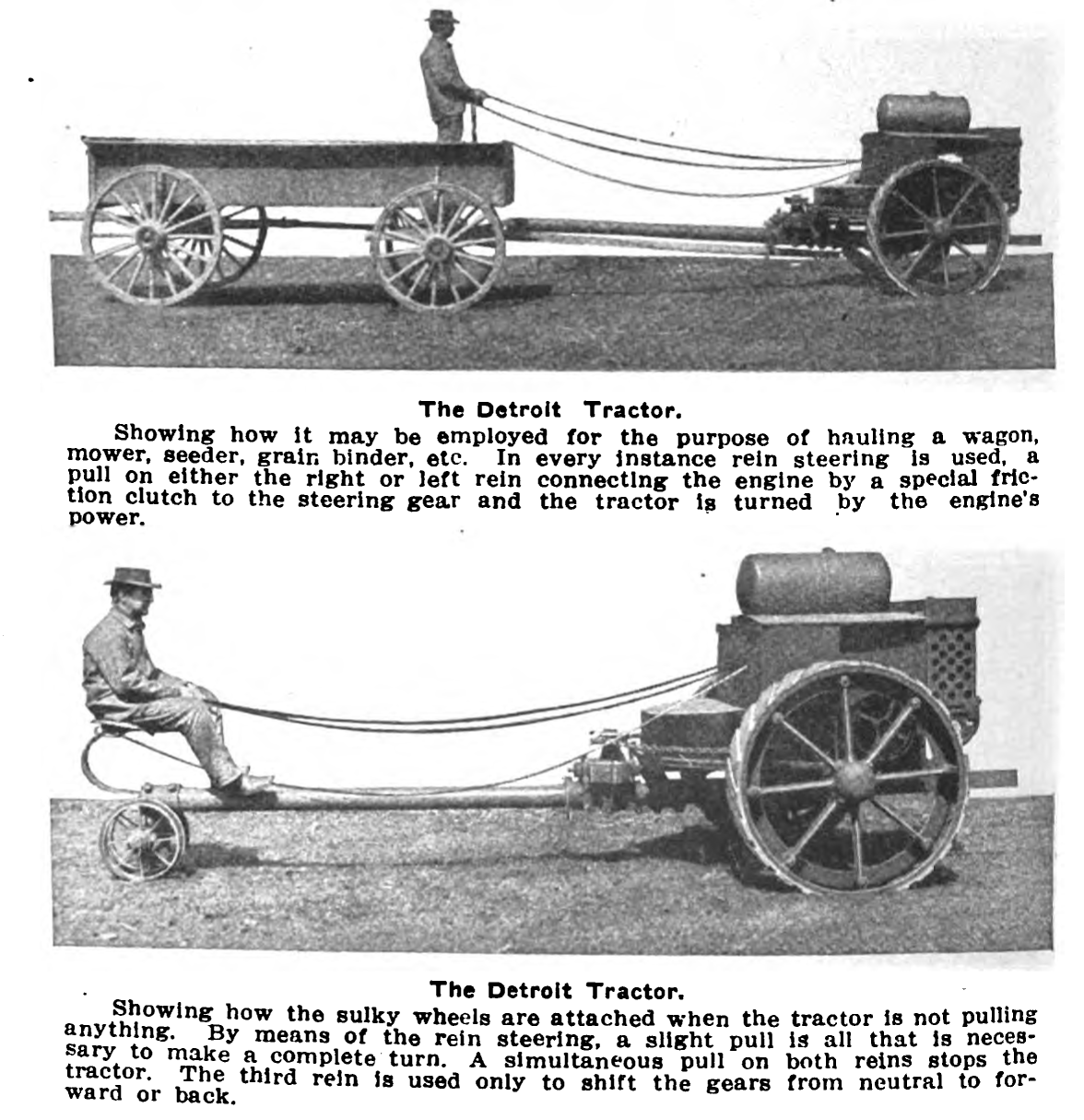
An advertisement for the Detroit Tractor Company in the Automobile Trade Journal, July 1913.

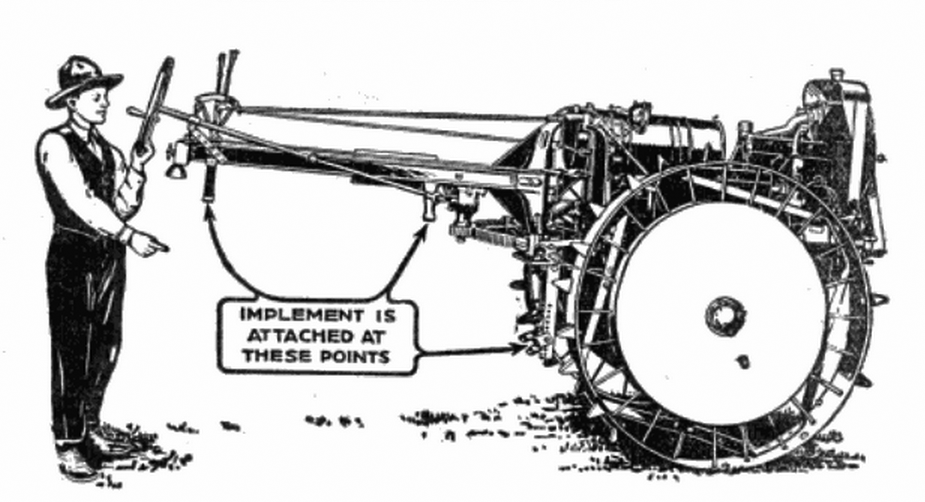
Moline Universal implement attachment points, 1920.

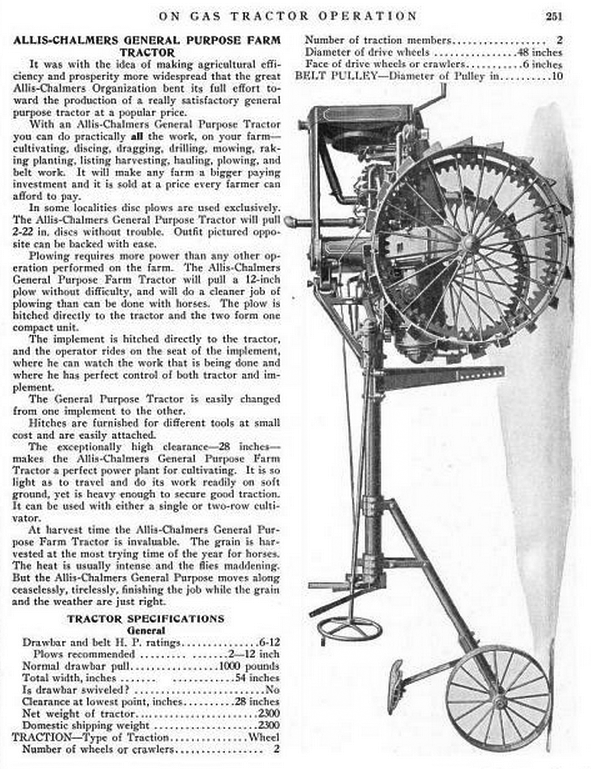
Allis-Chalmers 6–12 tractor, 1920.

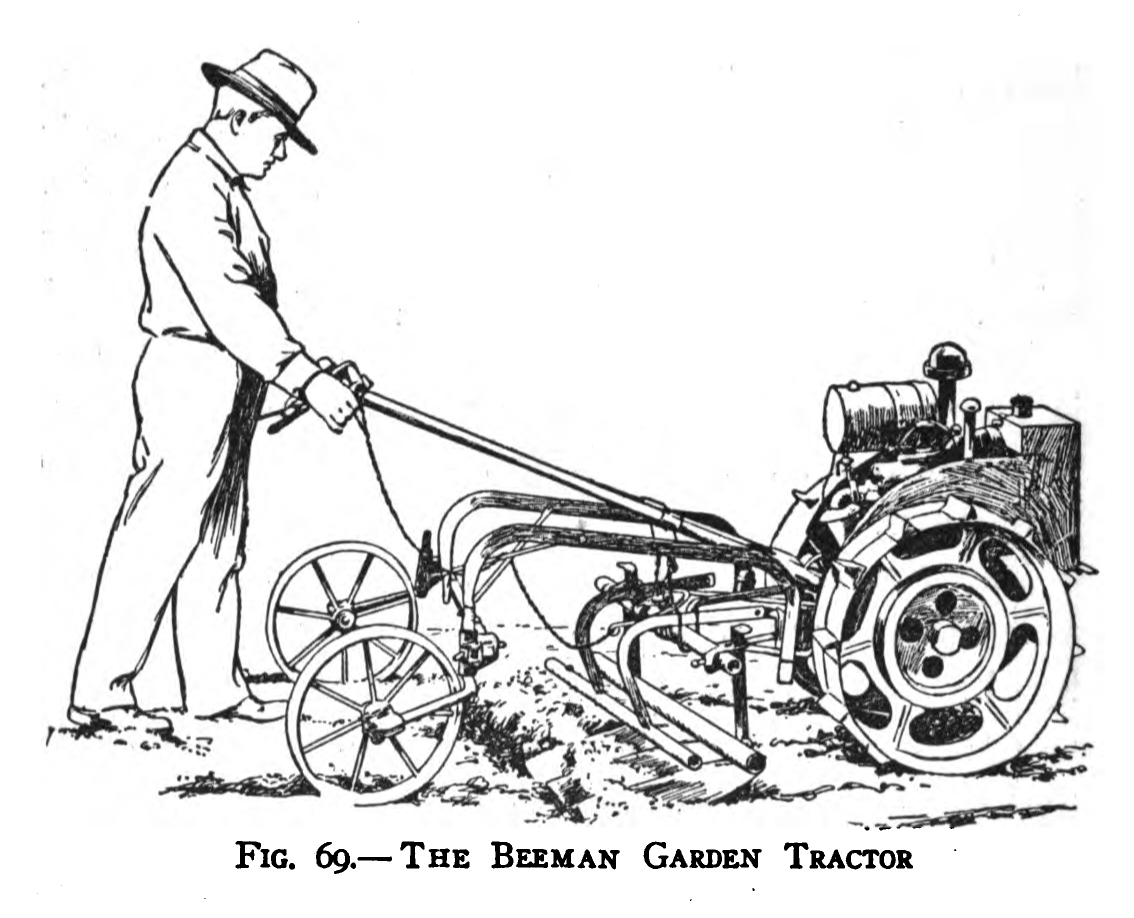
Beeman tractor, 1920.

Two-wheel tractors existed in the U.S. at least as early as 1913, when the Detroit Tractor Company advertised a tractor whose operator, riding on the implement, controlled the tractor via reins, just as he would a horse team. By 1918, the Moline Plow Company's Moline Universal Tractor likewise relied on its implement to supply the rear wheels in a four-wheel articulated unit, though its design dispensed with the long trailer tongue and horse reins. A 1918 example of Moline advertising called the Universal "the original two-wheel tractor", which was a fanciful claim in light of the Detroit Tractor and other machinery described with that phrase from 1913 through 1915. But Moline Plow no doubt felt pressured to claim priority in response to a very similarly built competitor, the Allis-Chalmers Model 6-12, which Moline Plow alleged was a patent-infringing copy.

E.R. Beeman invented the Gas Garden tractor, two wheeled walk behind model, in 190_. He had been a V.P. at Moline Plow Company prior to his invention. The BEEMAN Tractor Co. was located in Minneapolis, Minnesota. Previous to inventing Gas Garden Tractor, Mr. Beeman invented the Gas Garage door opener. As early as 1911, Benjamin Franklin Gravely of Charleston West Virginia began with connecting the Indian motorcycle to a manually operated push plow. In 1916 he incorporated and, after obtaining partners, began producing single-wheel tractors and attachments under the name Gravely Tractor. The Model "D" Gravely Power Plow, like the prototype, was a single-wheeled affair, with a 2 horsepower (1.5 kW) air-cooled engine. It wasn't until 1937 that Gravely would introduce the Model L two-wheeled tractor with a 5 horsepower (3.7 kW) engine. Through the 20th century, Gravely became arguably one of the most successful and recognizable two-wheeled tractors produced in the United States, at one point offering 120 individual attachments for their all-gear drive machines.

In 1915, Rush Hamilton of Healdsville, California, designed grouser drive wheels for his tractor, which came with an articulated two-iron-wheeled sulky to which wagons or plows could be attached. It was about this time that he formed the Hamilton Tractor Company. About 10 years later, the wheels were called "Hamilton wheels" when used on a Fordson tractor. In 1916 he helped form the Fageol Motors Company, where he assisted in the development of the Fageol tractor.

In 1932, Mando "Steve" Ariens, having just taken over the reins of his fathers' Brillion Iron Works, had to declare bankruptcy at the height of the Great Depression. In 1933, in his father Henry's garage and Steve's basement, he and his father developed their first Ariens Rotary Tiller, a 30" tiller, powered by a 14 hp (10 kW), front-mounted, four-cylinder V-type engine.

In 1930, automobile manufacturer Cadwallader Washburn "Carl" Kelsey was introduced to the rototiller by H.B. Hiller, a German immigrant who once worked for Siemens' "boden frasen" division. Kelsey opened a sales office using the name Rototiller Co. on Broadway in New York City. He then started importing Siemens boden frasen from Germany. In 1932, Kelsey incorporated using the new company name Rototiller, Inc. and the "Rototiller" trademark (Kelsey didn't coin the name 'Rototiller'; it was already being used in Europe). The operation was moved to Long Island City, NY. and SIMAR from Switzerland was added to the line. Carl Kelsey designed, patented and made several improvements to the SIMAR and Siemens machines because of the different American soils versus the European soil that had been farmed for many more centuries. One major improvement was a shock absorber to reduce tine spring return bounce. In 1934 Kelsey and Rototiller, Inc. introduced its first rotary tiller of its own design, the Model AA All-American. And in 1937 Rototiller, Inc. moved from its Long Island City facility to 102nd Street and 9th Avenue in Troy, New York. In 1945 after selling the larger B-series Rototillers and trademark to Graham-Paige Motors, Rototiller, Inc. converted to full-time production of various models of small horsepower home garden size rototillers.

In 1946, Cecil Pond of South Bend, Indiana, started the Wheel Horse Company, whose first product was a walk-behind two-wheel tractor.

In quick succession in 1959 and 1960, Rototiller traded hands to Porter Cable Company of Syracuse, New York, and then to Rockwell Manufacturing Company of Pittsburgh, Pennsylvania. The rear-tine rototiller business continued to decline and Porter-Cable sold its Rototiller and small engine division to Moto-Mower Division (Richmond, Indiana) of the Dura Corp. of Detroit (formerly Detroit Harvester) according to a May 10, 1962 article in the Richmond Palladium-Item & Sun-Telegram. In 1961 Rototiller, Inc. and the Roto-Ette trademark disappeared.

There were also numerous other American manufacturers of two-wheel tractors; among them: David Bradley, Choremaster, Simplicity and others. All these manufacturers operated in the 1940–1970 year range.

Today, the Ariens Company continues, and Gravely is now a subsidiary of Ariens. Gravely [Ariens] discontinued the production of their own two-wheel tractor in 2002. Since then, they for a short time imported a Swiss machine (the Rapid brand) and sold it under the Gravely label; they have discontinued this as well.

=== Japan ===
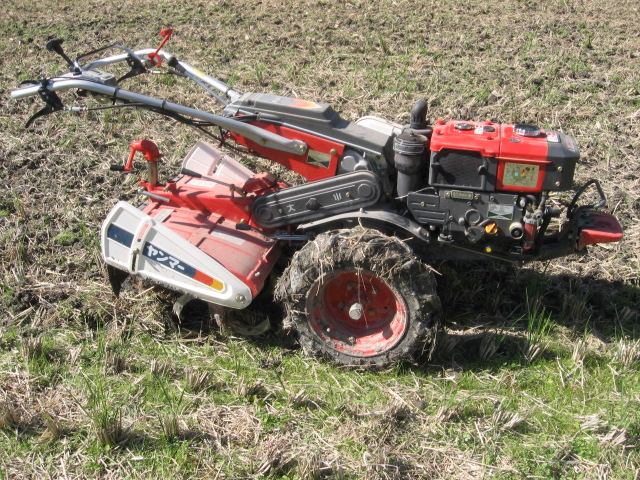
Japanese model at work

Japanese entrepreneurs began to indigenously design and manufacture two-wheel tractors in the early 1920s. According to Francks (1996) an Okayama farmer Nishizaki Hiroshi (born 1897) was returning from the World War I determined not to walk behind his father's draft animals and began experimenting with attaching a plow to the newly available small horsepower kerosene engines that farmers were beginning to use for pumping water and threshing. Nishazaki saw a Swiss made garden tractor (? SIMAR ?- Société Industrielle de Machines Agricoles Rotatives) being demonstrated through a Japanese government technology demonstration initiative in a nearby village (The Japanese agent of the Swiss machine company stopped importing by 1925 as the machine reportedly proved not capable of handling Japanese heavy rice soils). By 1926 Nishizaki had made his first version from a diesel powered engine connected by a belt to rotating blades mounted on a wooden frame with two wheels. Soon he began renting it out to neighbors. And as with all good ideas soon local multiple small workshops entered the scene producing various versions. By 1938 there were 22 manufacturers in Japan with 17 of them in Okayama. By 1939 there were over 2800 two-wheel tractors/rotovators in use in Japan. But by the early 1940s nearly half of all the machines were out of commission due to lack of quality and spare parts. After World War II small 2-wheel tractors were imported from the United States and were mainly intended for use in transportation/pulling carts and small trailers. As these gained popularity many Japanese manufacturers "...taking hints gleaned from foreign machines..." started production using the American as their initial model (Francks 1996: 789).

Farmers quickly found that 2-wheel tractors were more economical to use, as compared to keeping animals for tillage and 2-wheel tractors began selling widely. Agricultural machinery dealers received cattle for the barter for tractors and they and in turn sold the cattle in the meat market. Average tractor horsepower per hectare in 1950 was nearly zero. This average grew to 0.86 PS per hectare within ten years with the rapid spread of 2-wheel tractors. Trailer attachments were also being widely utilized for transportation.

Matsuyamasuki, presently known as Niplo brand, invented the Japanese style mold board plow to be attached to 2-wheel tractor, that made plowing with a moldboard possible with 2.5 horsepower (1.9 kW) tractors.

Though four-wheel "riding" tractors began to spread in the 1960s, and are taking over primary tillage operations, 2-wheel tractors are still popular in Japan for primary tillage and inter-cultivation in vegetable production, transportation around the farm, etc. Most farm households that own a 4-wheel tractor also own at least one 2-wheel tractor.

=== Thailand ===
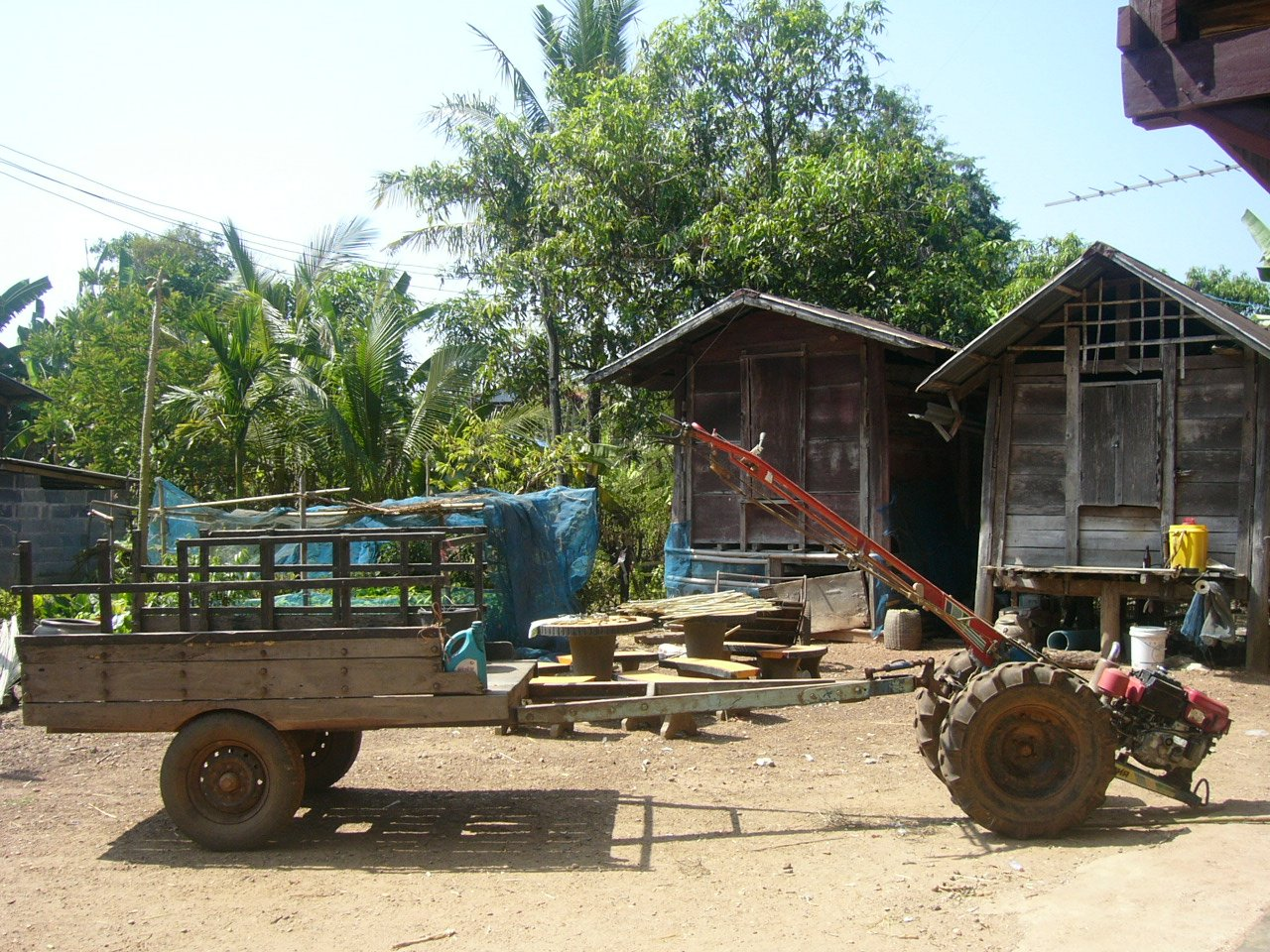
Two-wheel tractor with trailer in Thailand (2004)

The unique long-handled "Thai" type two-wheel tractor was developed in the late 1950s by M.R. Debriddhi Devakul (M.R. stands for Mom Rajawong, meaning that his great-grandfather was the King of Thailand, and that he could be properly addressed as "Prince"), head of the Engineering Division of the Thai Rice Department, of the Thai Ministry of Agriculture and Cooperatives. As the early 2WTs did not have steering clutches, longer handles were provided for turning and controlling the tractor more easily in fields. Initially the engines were taken from kerosene engine powered irrigation pumps, but as the popularity of the tractor became obvious (known as the "Iron Buffalo"), three Japanese firms set up diesel engine factories in Thailand with agreements to progressively increase local content. Later, steering clutches were provided on many companies' models. The tractor gear box and chassis are made by many local industries (Samakkee Lohakij Ltd., Agri-Mechanics Co Ltd., Ayutthaya Tractor Factory, Cosmonoki Thai International Co. Ltd., C.R. Tractor Co Ltd, Inter Kankaset Co. Ltd, Jakpetch Tractor Co. Ltd., Jor Charoenchai Tractor, Kor Rungruang, Muileng Industry Ltd., Samakkee Lohakij Ltd., Siam Kubota Industry Co. Ltd., etc.). Initially, factories copied from one another, and competing for sales to the point that the tractor's chassis without engine has become very inexpensive, about one third to one half the cost of the engine. The "Thai tractor" eventually evolved into a more general standard "NC" type models with three gears forward, one reverse, and steering clutches. Attachments that are available are moldboard and disc plows, spiked tooth harrows, trailed-type (non-powered) rotary puddlers (lateral drums with protruding paddles), various types of levelers and simple trailers (usually without brakes or lights). Recently (2010), a new NC Plus model offered by Siam Kubota comes with a power take off (PTO) that can drive a rotary tiller and other attachments. Additionally many farmers use V-belts to connect the stationary tractor engine to power centrifugal pumps and axial flow pumps, rice threshers, maize shellers etc. Recently, inexpensive Chinese-made NC models have come on the international market but attempts have been made by Siam Kubota and others to keep them out of Thailand, Cambodia and elsewhere due to claims of copyright infringement. Through the 1980s and 1990s, more than 50,000 tractors were reportedly being produced and sold each year and by 2006 more than 70,000 were being produced and even more imported so that estimates of 2WT population is between 1.7 – 2.0 million 2WTs in Thailand.

=== Sri Lanka ===
In 1955, Ray Wijewardene designed a two-wheel tractor. An early attempt to mechanize farm labour during the Green Revolution, it was eventually manufactured and marketed worldwide by the Landmaster company in Nottingham, UK. By 1975 nearly 11,000 units had been imported. In 1975, the Sri Lanka Air Force began manufacturing two-wheel tractors under the "Guvan" marque. By 2001, over 2,000 mostly Chinese 2WTs were being imported per year and by 2007 it was estimated that there were over 125,000 2WTs in Sri Lanka. The term "Landmaster" is still used in Sri Lanka for any make.

=== India ===
Interest in two-wheel tractors in India began with special government programs in the 1960s. Before that first tractor Directly purchased from Japan to Madurai. That aided in setting up multiple joint ventures with Japanese two-wheel tractor manufacturers. Initial government prospects for two-wheel tractors were very high (targets were set at 100,000 two-wheel tractors sold per year by mid-1970s). To meet these expectations the Government of India expanded its efforts to include government subsidies, and greatly increased research, development and extension programs for two-wheel tractors. Despite these efforts two-wheel tractor adoption has been disappointing. Especially so when current number of two-wheel tractors estimated at 100,000 are compared with neighboring Sri Lanka's and Bangladesh's two-wheel tractor populations of 120,000 and 800,000 respectively- countries that are a fraction the size of India but with very similar agricultural and socio-economic systems. There have been many reasons offered and even official investigations into the low adoption rates. One main reason given here is that prices of the joint venture Indian-Japanese two-wheel tractors are twice as expensive as compared to the nearly identical Chinese made two-wheel tractors available in Sri Lanka and Bangladesh.

Despite the increased competition from China, Kirloskar's KOEL division, began production in 2015 of their indigenously developed Mega-T brand 15 horsepower diesel engine 2-wheel tractor as well as offering various attachments like rotovator, reaper-harvester, seed drill, etc.

Indian manufactures that did not survive are: JK Satoh Agricultural Machinery Ltd. a collaboration between JK Cotton Spinning and Weaving Mills Ltd (based in Kanpur, UP) and Satoh Agricultural Machinery Ltd., Japan, began production of two-wheel tractors in a plant with a capacity of 6000 units per year but from its beginning in 1972 till closure of the plant in 1977 only produced and sold 800 units.

=== Bangladesh ===
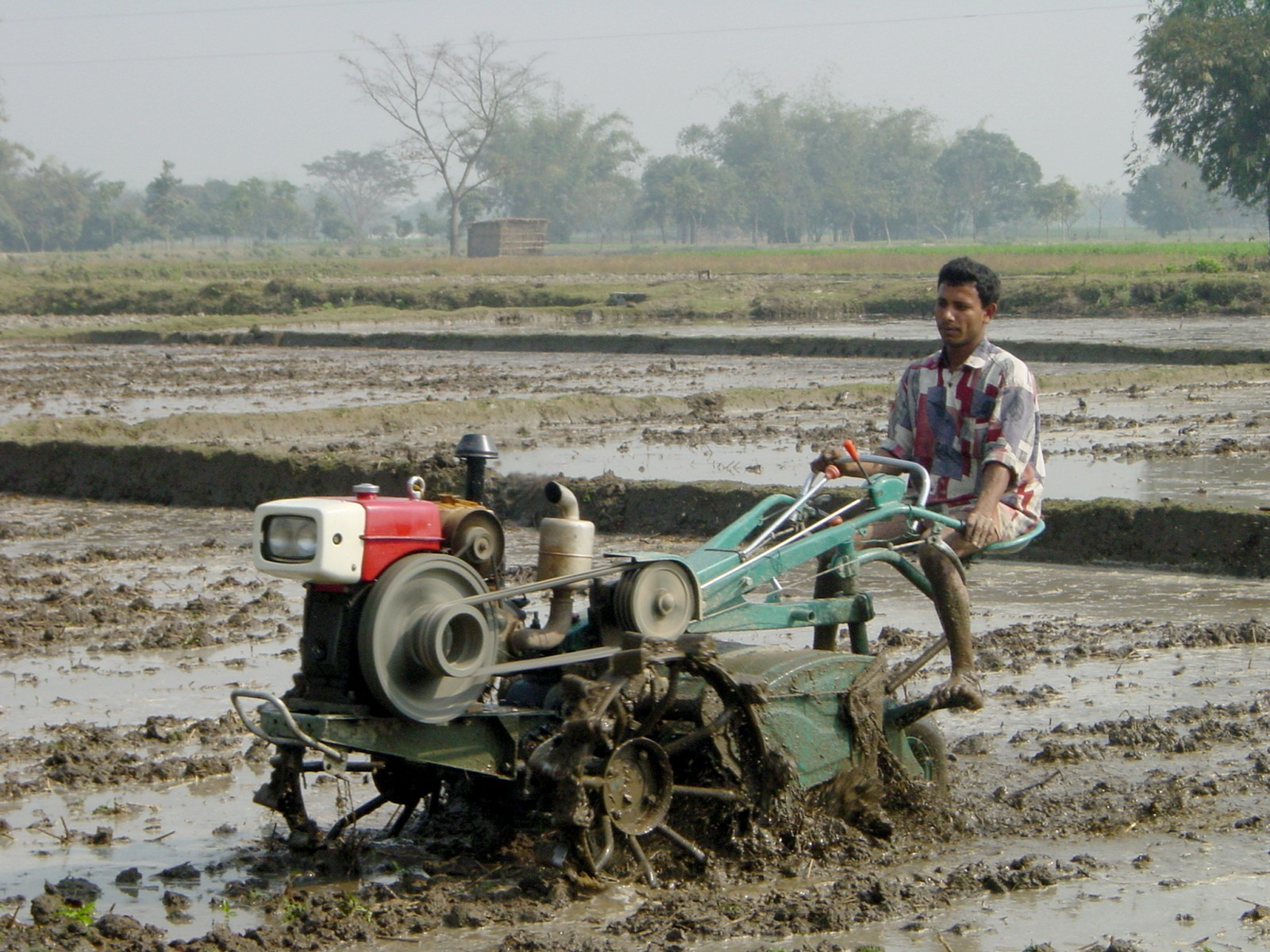
Bangladeshi farmer puddling (with metal cage-wheels) his neighbors' rice fields

History of two-wheel tractors began with efforts in the late 1970s to promote Japanese imported two-wheel tractors. Adoption remained low through most of the 1980s. In 1987 a large cyclone killed much of the livestock and bullock population. With no prospect for timely restoration of the bullock population, the government began to allow what they once considered inferior quality Chinese two-wheel tractors to be imported to aid in fulfilling farmers land preparation needs. Chinese two-wheel tractors cost 50% less than the comparable Japanese manufactured two-wheel tractors and adoption quickly increased, to over 100,000 by 1993, 200,000 by the late 1990s and some current estimates put the number at well over 300,000 Chinese two-wheel tractors. By 2020 numbers are estimated to be over 800,000. Though there has been some criticism on the high cost of imports, others have noted that there is now a very large spare parts industry in support of the Chinese imports.

=== Philippines ===
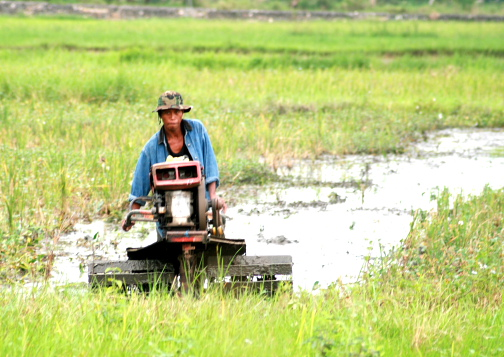
The kuliglig as used for farming.

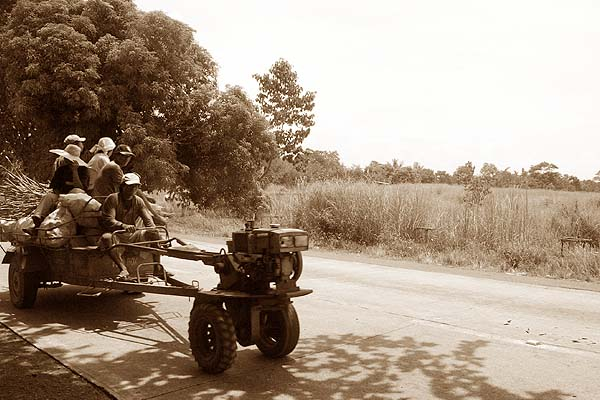
The kuliglig attached to a trailer for transportation.

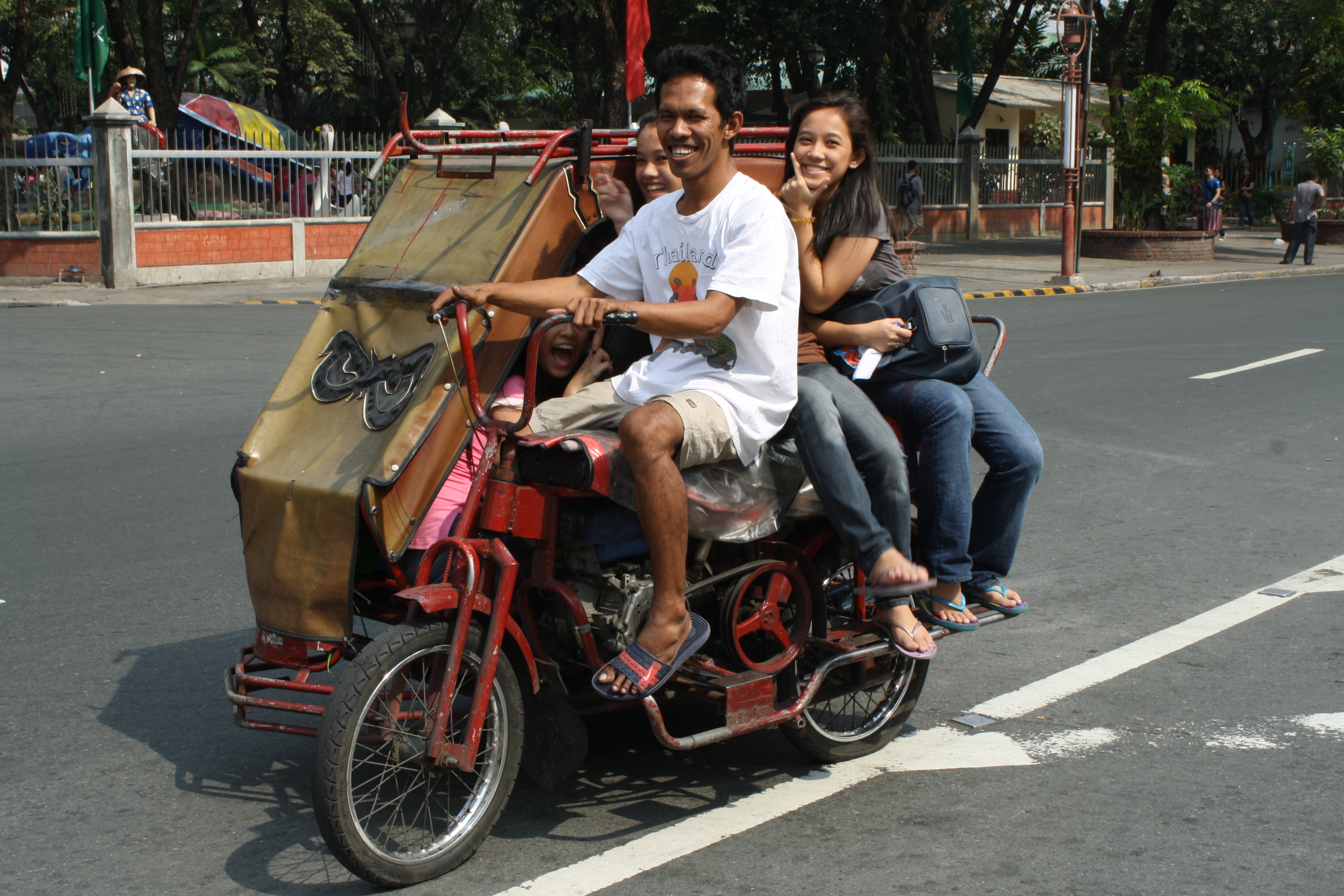
A passenger kuliglig in Metro Manila.

A kuliglig is a vehicle composed of a two-wheeled trailer pulled by a two-wheeled tractor similar to a rotary tiller. It is powered by multi-purpose diesel or gasoline engine, commonly used in the provinces of the Philippines. The kuliglig traces its etymology from the Filipino term kuliglig, meaning "cicada" (a type of insect) which was adopted by one manufacturer as a brand.

Kuligligs are commonly used for:

- A carabao replacement, as handier tool for farming.
- When connected to a trailer, it can be used for the transportation of people or farm goods.
- When connected to a water pump, it can be used for irrigating rice and vegetable fields; at times it is also used for fish pond operations.
- On some occasions where-in there is difficulty of procuring APCs to fight insurgents, a mounted machine gun at the trailer will make it into a mobile attack unit, similarly used by AFP during their battles in Mindanao and Cordillera areas.
- When connected to a grindstone, it can be used for sharpening blades, sanding and steel brushing.
- On some occasions or festivals, it is used as a float during parades.
- It is sometimes used for races.

According to the Land Transportation Office, the kuliglig owner is not required to register his vehicle since it has no serial number and has purposes other than simple transportation.

In some urban areas, kuligligs are sometimes used as an alternative public utility vehicle. These are modified three-wheel pedicabs (cycle rickshaw) with attached motor engines used by fishing boats (bancas). The operation of these version of kuliglig has been banned in Metro Manila due to noise pollution but are still present in the provinces.

== Usage ==
=== Numbers of tractors in use ===
China has the highest numbers that are estimated to approach 16 million. What percentage of this total is used in agriculture is not well understood. Their previously noted multiple work roles is said to have a large percentage used for transport in rural areas as well as peri-urban construction sites, etc.

Thailand and Vietnam both manufacture and import and have estimated population of 3 million and 500,000 respectively. Bangladesh has for two decades imported over 50,000 per year and is estimated to have 800,000. Sri Lanka has an estimated 120,000. And Nepal imports around 5,000 Chinese 2WTs per year with estimated population of over 40,000. Parts of Africa have begun importing Chinese tractors and Nigeria have an estimated population close to 100,000.

In Europe: Southern Germany, northern and southern Italy, Switzerland, and many countries of central/Eastern Europe also have significant populations of 2-wheel tractors, as they have been sold there for agricultural use since the 1940s.

=== Safety issues ===
A number of reports have highlighted safety concerns associated with the operation of two-wheel tractors. The most common accidents involve crossing the bunds and road transport. The operation of two-wheel tractors for transport at night is a recognised hazard in many countries, particularly as single headlights can be mistaken for a motorcycle. Research undertaken in Cambodia and Laos concluded that two-wheel tractors are involved in around five per cent of fatal accidents. Occupational health and safety reports have recommended regular breaks for the machine operator due to vibrations. However, safety researchers have concluded that "the risk to public safety must be weighed against the economic and social benefits."

== Manufacturers ==
=== Asia ===
==== China ====
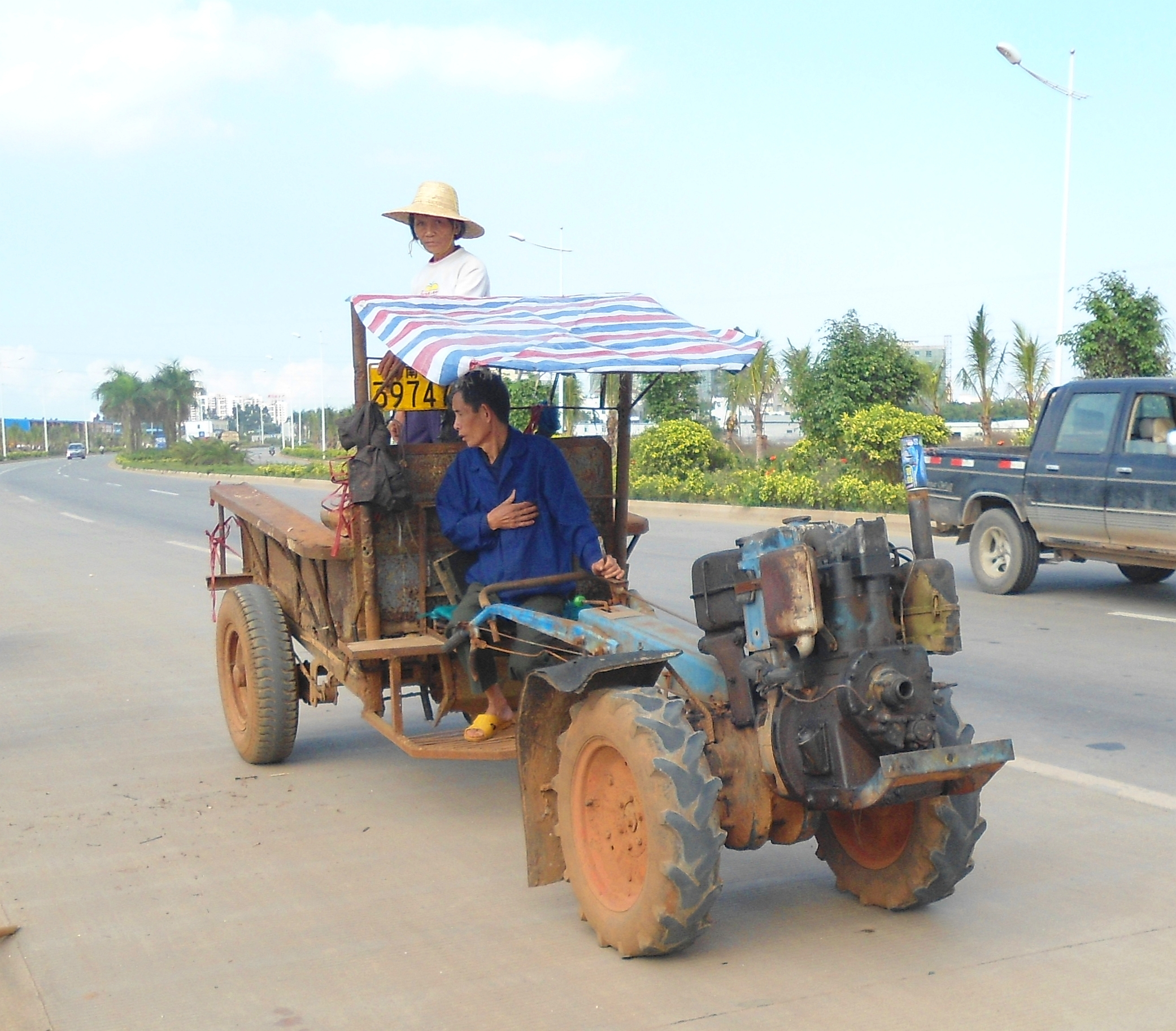
A farming couple in rural Hainan, China selling sugar cane to people as they drive by them. Two-wheel tractors are far less common than 4-wheel tractors in Hainan.

Changzhou Dongfeng Agricultural Machinery Group Co.
Located in Changzhou, Jiangsu Provence near Shanghai Changzhou Dongfeng Agricultural Machinery Group Co. claims to be the only manufacturer in China that owns the Dong Feng brand name. Manufacturing more than 150,000 DF model two-wheel tractors a year in 12, 14 and 15 hp (11 kW) ranges. It has recently expanded into the 4-wheel tractor market manufacturing over 30,000 tractors in the 20–90 hp (15–70 kW) range, under the brand name CHANGTUO.
Zhejiang Sifang Group
Zhejiang Sifang group, founded in 1961, produces GN type or model 2WTs at their Yongkang tractor Factory in Zhejiang Province. Like DFAM above, Zhejiang SiFang Group claims to be the only manufacturer in China that owns the Sifang brand name. They also manufacture a broad range of single cylinder diesel engines and small combine harvesters (.8 to 1.3 meter heads).
Shandong Mingsin Machinery (Group) Co., Ltd.
Shandong Mingsin Machinery (Group) Co., Ltd., located in Shandong Province, is the special manufacturing factory for the four-wheel tractor, crawler tractor, two-wheel tractor (walking tractor), power tiller and small farm tractors. This factory could manufacture the tractors from 12 hp to 300 hp, the walking tractors from 6 hp to 22 hp. To cover the different kinds of field and plants, this factory designed the different models walking tractor and make the walking tractor to meet the field like paddy field or dry field, and also the different kinds of plants and using habit of the farmers.

==== India ====
Kerala Agricultural Machinery Corporation (KAMCO)
Located in Kerala in southern India, KAMCO in cooperation with Kubota, Japan, started manufacturing in 1973, manufacturers 3, 4.5, 9 & 12 hp (8.9 kW) two-wheel tractor with a range of attachments, a two-wheel tractor walk behind 3.5 hp 120 centimeter reaper and a small 5 hp (3.7 kW). It currently sells nearly 12000 of its 2-wheel tractors per year.
VST Tiller Tractors Ltd.
Located in Bangalore, VST Tiller Tractors Ltd, part of the VST Group in 1965, in association and joint venture with the Mitsubishi Group, Japan, began production of single cylinder diesel engines and two-wheel tractors. Currently they offer three versions of its VST Shakti brand two-wheel tractors with rotary tillers. The 13 hp (9.7 kW) VST Shakti 130DI/CT85, the 9 hp (6.7 kW) Mitsubishi Shakti VWH 120/ CT85, and 8 hp (6.0 kW) Mitsubishi Shakti AD 8V/CT85. In 2003 they also began importing DF model 2-wheel tractors from China and marketing them as Dragon Tractors under their Shakti Brand.
Indra Marshal
Located in Indore is a power tiller manufacturer in India. Indramarshal is a leading agricultural engineering company and has been in business for more than 49 years. They manufacture 14.1 HP power tillers and 5 and 8 HP Power Weeders.
Mega T
Mega T is the relatively new brand of a series of 12 and 15 HP two-wheel tractors (2WTs – aka power tillers) offered by KMW, which itself is the farm mechanization brand of Kirloskar Oil Engines Limited a subsidiary under Kirloskar Group. Most models come with a 20 blade rotovator and steerable trailing wheel and seat. It follows closely the standard Chinese and Japanese 2WT designs but with some improvements including a hydraulic actuated internal heavy duty brake drum, padded seat, adjustable width tires, side facing PTO drive shaft, etc. They also offer a range of other attachments like 1.2 meter wide reaper harvester, 5 row planter, potato digger, MB and disc plows and sprayer. The manufacturing plant is in Kagal in Kolhapur district of Maharashtra.

==== Indonesia ====
Quick Tractor, Karya Hidup Sentosa CV
Started the business in 1953. Quick Tractor, located in Yogyakarta, is the most prominent manufacturer of two wheel tractor in Indonesia. With 120.000 units production capacity annually, Quick Tractor covers more than 70% of national demand, making it the top selling brand in Indonesia. It operates 2 factories, both in Yogyakarta. To date, Quick Tractor remains the only Indonesian manufacturer of two wheel tractor.

==== Thailand ====
The Siam Kubota Industry Co., Ltd.
Located in Bangkok, Thailand, Siam Kubota Industry Co., Ltd. is a joint venture between The Siam Cement Pcl., Kubota Corporation, Marubeni Corporation, and Min Sen Machinery Co., Ltd. than began operations in 1978. They make a range of harvesters, 4-wheel tractors and 2-wheel tractors. They offer four models of walk behind (without sulky seat) and with single and double (steering) clutches.
STI International Flying Star.
Established in 1983 S.T.I. International Co., Ltd. is located at Wangnoi, Ayuthaya Province and manufactures engines, water pumps 2WTs and lawnmowers and variety of other agricultural and construction machinery.
Talaythong Factory Company Ltd
Established in 1970 the Talaythong Factory Co., Ltd. is located in Panatnikhom, Chonburi and has a wide product range that includes several "Thai" models of 2WTs, small diesel engines, disc plough, rice mill, threshers, shrimp farm equipment, evaporation system equipment and multi-purpose agricultural vehicles, all manufactured and marketed under the Talaythong brand.

==== Vietnam ====
Vikyno, Southern Agricultural Machinery Company- Vietnam
a manufacturer since 1967 of compact diesel engines, four-wheel (including Kubota under 35HP) and two-wheel tractors and agricultural machinery like rice mills and powered reapers. 2WTs models are:

- MK55 + Gasoline Engine 168F.
- MK70 + Diesel Engine RV70.
- MK120S + Diesel Engine RV 125–2.
- MK120 + Diesel Engine RV 125–2.
- MK120B + Diesel Engine RV 125–2.
- MK165 + Diesel Engine RV 165–2.

Vietnam Engine and Agricultural Machinery Corporation
VEAM produces several 2 wheel tractors, rice cutters and harvesters.

=== Western world ===
==== Germany ====
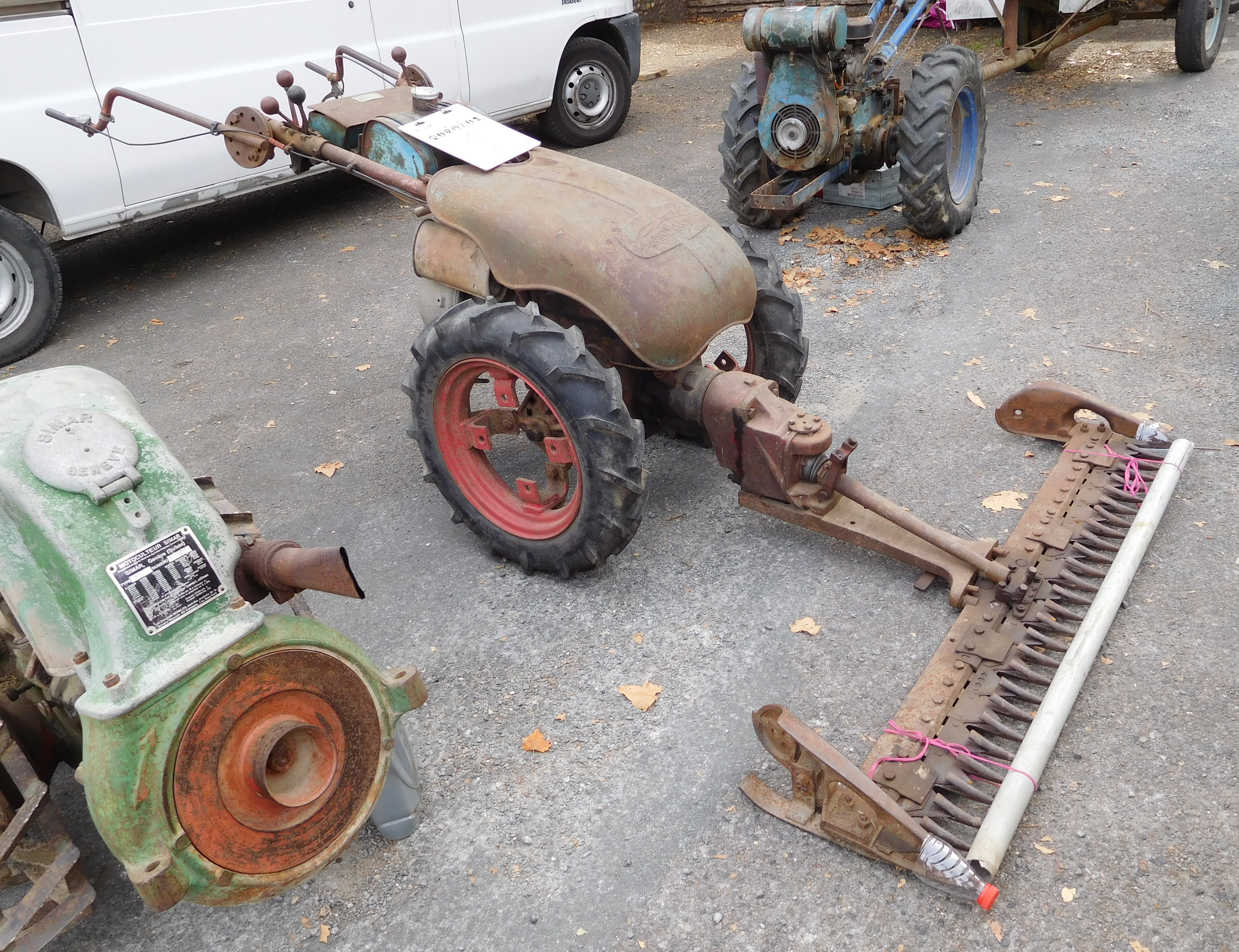
Motostandard two-wheel tractor with mowers (1)

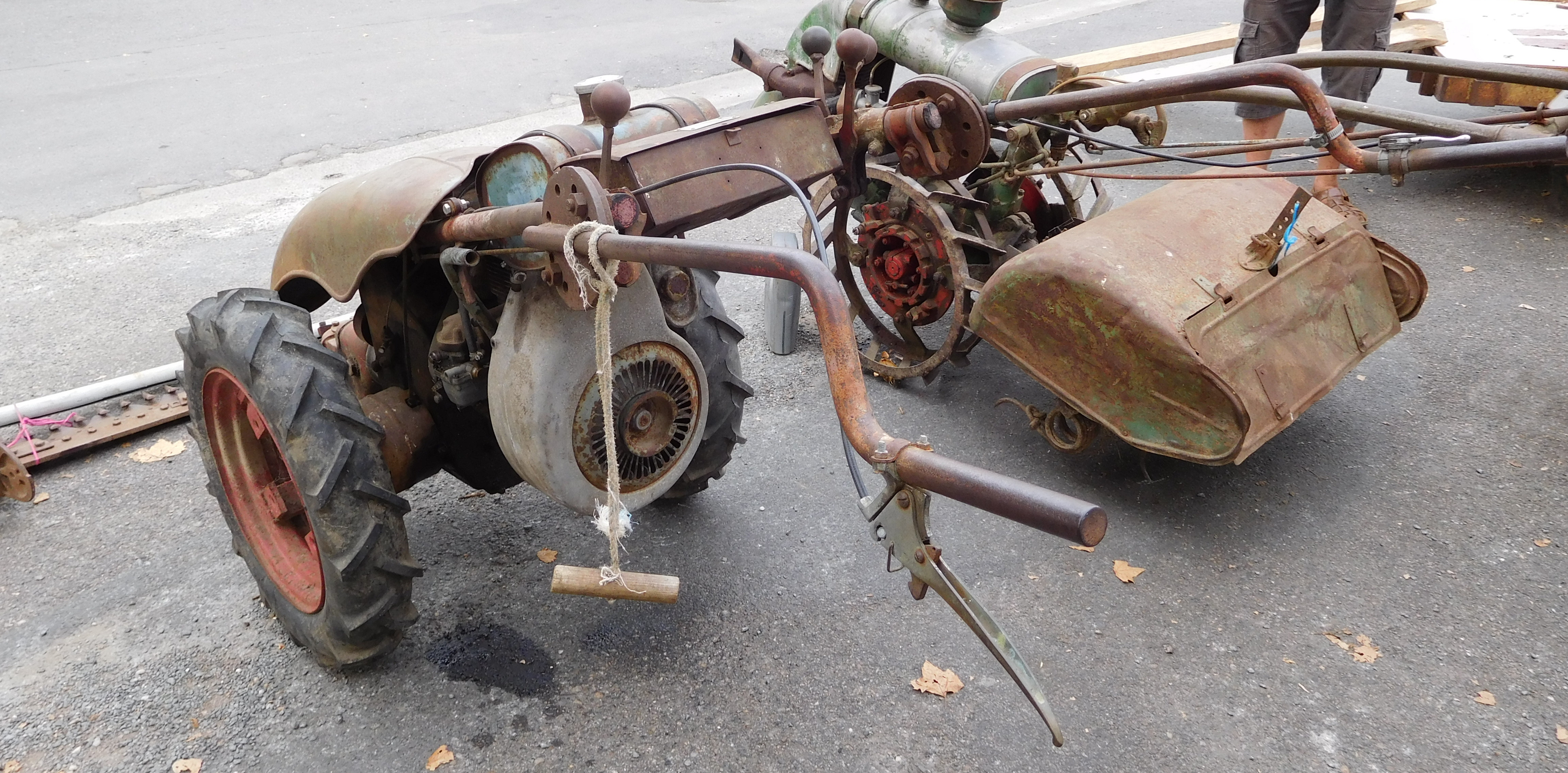
Motostandard two-wheel tractor with mowers (2)

Agria
Makers of two-wheel garden and farm two-wheel tractors with a variety of implements. The company was established in post-war Germany in the southwest of the country, in the federal state of Baden-Württemberg. The founder of the Mockmuhl Machine factory was Erwin Machtel, who, together with his partner and Technical Director Dr.Ing. Otto Gohler, managed in 1945 to re-locate the pre-war production line and materials of the Karlsruhe Gears Factory to the neighboring town of Ruchsen. In response to the local vintner needs of the time, Machtel and Gohler were encouraged to produce their first non-wheeled power hoe, a project which transported the name Mockmuhl all over the world. Soon the wheeled version followed. In 1948 the 100th machine was sold. In 1958 the 100,000th machine was unveiled at the German Agricultural Fair by the then Minister and later Prime Minister Dr. Lübke. In 2001 the one millionth machine was raffled to the public at the Cologne International Gardening Fair. It was one of the Model 100, which represents Agria's most popular model of power hoe.
Gutbrod (MotoStandard)
Company produced in Saarland. Makers of two-wheel farm tractors with a variety of implements.
Brielmayer
Based in Southern Germany in Deggenhausertal / Mennwangen, Brielmmayer was established in the mid-1980s and has evolved into a manufacturer of high end 2-wheel tractors that focus on highland-Alpine farm pasture grass management through individually configurable broad-gauge mowers and accessories. One of their newest models "Duo 6" comes with a 6 m wide cutter bar where two base machines (tractors) are powering at each end of the cutter bar. It utilizes a "fly-by-wire" controls where the driver operates both machines from one tractor. Having such wide base stabilizing each other, along with Brielmaier patented studded wide roller wheels allows it to work safely on inclines greater than 30%. They also offer a range of pasture tools such as rake-tedder, hay pusher as well as snow removal equipment like blower and plows. Known for its innovation Brielmaier use hydraulic motors for the tractors transmission but also for powering attachments. They came out with remote control console to add an additional layer of safety for the operator for use under more challenging conditions.

==== Italy ====
Two-wheel tractor in Italy (2008)

Grillo
Grillo spa began in the Romagna region in the early 1950s developing a farm hoe for weeding in fruit orchards. In 1953 the first Grillo walking tractor was born. The Grillo winning idea was to detach the motorized tractor from the attachments. It became possible to fit tines, ploughs, and trailers, and via fitting a water pump it was possible to irrigate. In 1955 the factory started the first series production of 15 different models per year. In 1957 "Grillo" became the name of the factory (formerly Pinza) and a brand. In the late 1960s, Grillo formed a technology-sharing venture with the Italian manufacturer BCS, with the goal of expanding their versatility in implement types to include mowing and other front-PTO applications. The two companies worked together until the early 1980s. In the 1980s the company experienced a considerable growth in garden machines, and also in lawn-care equipment; In that decade the Grillo research and development department created the first Italian lawnmower with a double hydrostatic system. Today thousands of machines are sold throughout the world annually. The name "Grillo" means "Cricket" in Italian.
BCS Group
BCS was founded in 1943 by Luigi Castoldi in his workshop in Abbiategrasso, a small town near Milan. The area was and still is highly agricultural. For this reason the motor-mower (essentially an engine-driven, walk-behind sickle-bar mower) model 243 was created. This was among the first self-propelled motor-mowers in the world. At the end of the 1960s BCS entered into a technology-sharing venture with the Grillo company of Italy, the goal being to integrate soil-working implements into the BCS line. This venture lasted until the early 1980s, and served to launch BCS into the field of green maintenance machines by producing their first "light" multipurpose two-wheel tractors. Starting in 1970, BCS introduced rotary disc-mowers (for 4-wheel tractor mounting). In 1988 BCS purchased Ferrari at Luzzara and in 1999 BCS purchased Pasquali at Calenzano; these acquisitions strengthened BCS Group's divisions with two brands with an international reputation, and since Ferrari and Pasquali produced 4-wheel tractors, these purchases allowed BCS to move into the 4-wheel tractor market. BCS Group presently counts on three production plants (Abbiategrasso, Luzzara, and Cusago) and on six branches.
BCS Tractors
BCS are makers of two-wheel and four wheel tractors targeting both agriculture and commercial lawn and greens care. Headquarters and factories are located in

Abbiategrasso.

Ferrari
Ferrari is a manufacturer of two and four wheel tractors devoted to agriculture and lawn care. It was created in 1954, during the agricultural reconstruction period of the country. After an initial period dedicated to the production of wire-drawing machines for irrigation pipes, in 1957 Ferrari took part in the Verona exhibition with its first agricultural machine: the two-wheel tractor MC 57, which carries the date of its birth. In 1965 Ferrari launched the first articulated tractor MT65. The range of products was increased to motor mowers and tractors for diverse applications. At the end of the 1960s, the company looked to foreign markets; the subsidiary company Ferrari France was established in 1972. In 1988 Ferrari became part of the BCS Group. Today Ferrari has a wide range of machines between maintenance machines for recreational use and professional tractors for niche agriculture. Headquarters and factories are located at Abbiategrasso.
Pasquali Macchine Agricole
Founded in 1949 by Dr. Lino Pasquali, the company began production of two-wheel tractors, and in the late 1950s ergonomic improvements such as rubber tires, seat, and steering handles were added. In the late 1960s a line of articulated four-wheel tractors was added. In 1999, the BCS group purchased the Pasquali brand. Pasquali machines work all over the world, with a wide range of motor mowers, two-wheel tractors, and specialized tractors with power up to 100 hp. Headquarters and factories are located at Abbiategrasso.

Other Italian manufacturers include Goldoni, Bertolini, SEP/Barbieri, Casorzo, Lampacrescia, Fort, MAB, Meccanica Benassi, Nibbi, Adriatica, and Mira (as of 2014).

==== Switzerland ====
Bucher Industries

In 1945 the first "Record" two-wheel power mower came off the line. In 1950 The Bucher KT 10 'walking' tractor for tillage and other farm related work went into production. In 2003 Bucher sold the two-wheel tractor division. Over this period a total of 116,000 two-wheel motor-driven machines had been delivered.

==== United Kingdom ====
Mayfield Tractors
Mayfield pedestrian tractors appeared on the market sometime about 1949 and were principally designed as a grass cutter in much the same vein as the Allen Scythe. Subsequently, a comprehensive range of attachments were available to turn the tractor into a useful tool for the smallholder and market gardener. Assembly was carried out at the Balfour works of S R Wood & Co in Croydon but latterly moved to a site in Redhill, Surrey.

==== United States ====
Established in 1916, Gravely Tractors began production of two-wheel tractor with moldboard plows costing approximately US$170 and slowly grew to become one of the most recognized commercial lawn and garden machinery manufacturers in the US. In 1986 Gravely became a wholly owned subsidiary of the Ariens Company. Gravely [Ariens] discontinued the production of their own two-wheel tractor in 2002. Since then, they for a short time imported a Swiss machine (the Rapid brand) and sold it under the Gravely label; they have discontinued this as well. Until 2016 when the Gravely QXT (Quick eXchanging Tractor) was introduced to celebrate their 100th anniversary.

Tilmor
Tilmor is an American company formed in the 21st century owing to the difficulties in obtaining appropriate equipment faced by organic and small scale farms in the United States. The company began selling their Power Ox two-wheel tractor in 2019. The tractor is designed for planting, cultivating, light hilling, and to work with an array of unpowered implements, including various implements that Tilmor itself carries and also existing implements for the long discontinued Planet Jr. Walk Behind Tractor.

== See also ==
- Monowheel tractor
- Tricycle truck
