= ETAS (disambiguation) =

ETAS may refer to:

- ETAS, a global company providing tools for embedded systems
- End of Train Air System, a device put at the end of trains to monitor the brake air
- Etas, an imprint of Rizzoli Libri division of Arnoldo Mondadori Editore
- Former ICAO code for Sembach Kaserne.

== See also ==
- Eta (disambiguation)
