= Graveley =

Graveley may refer to:

- Graveley, Hertfordshire
- Graveley, Cambridgeshire

== See also ==
- Gravely (disambiguation)
