= Eta (disambiguation) =

Eta (Η or η) is the seventh letter of the Greek alphabet.

Eta or ETA may also refer to:

== People and fictional characters ==
- Eta (given name), a list of people and fictional characters
- Marie-Louise Eta (born 1991), German football player and manager

== Aircraft ==
- Eta (glider), a German-Italian motor glider
- CNA Eta, an Italian aircraft

== Brands and organizations ==
- Eta, a snack food brand owned by Griffin's Foods
- Empresa de Transporte Aéreo, a defunct Brazilian airline
- Environmental Transport Association, a British roadside assistance company
- ETA SA, a Swiss watchmaking company
- ETA (Czech company), a Czech household-appliance company and brand
- ETA Star Group, a Dubai-based investment company
- ETA Systems, a defunct American computer manufacturer
- Electronics Technicians Association, a professional association
- England Touch Association, the national governing body for touch rugby

== Education ==
- Engineering & Technologies Academy, in San Antonio, Texas, United States
- Ethiopian Teachers' Association, a trade union
- Evangelical Theological Academy, in Zwijndrecht, Netherlands
- Evangelical Theological Association, a former teaching institute in Melbourne, Australia

== Government and politics ==
- ETA (separatist group) (Basque: Euskadi Ta Askatasuna), a Basque armed separatist group
- Electronic travel authorization, or electronic travel authority, an alternative to a travel visa
- Employment and Training Administration, of the United States Department of Labor
- European Technical Assessment, an analytical document written by the European Organisation for Technical Approvals

== Science and technology ==
- Eicosatetraenoic acid or ETA, a fatty acid
- Ethanolamine or ETA, a naturally occurring organic compound
- Ethionamide or ETA, an antibiotic used to treat tuberculosis
- Event tree analysis or ETA, a logical modeling technique
- SARS-CoV-2 Eta variant, one of the viruses that causes COVID-19

== Music ==
- "ETA" (song), 2023, by NewJeans
- "E.T.A.", a song by Damon & Naomi from More Sad Hits, 1992
- "E.T.A.", a song by Justin Bieber from Changes, 2020
- "ETA", a song by Dr. Dre, Snoop Dogg, Busta Rhymes and Anderson .Paak from GTA Online: The Contract, 2022
- "ETA", a song by Chandler Leighton, 2024

== Other uses ==
- Elvis tribute artist, an Elvis Presley impersonator
- Eta, a derogatory term for the Burakumin in the Japanese feudal era
- Estimated time of arrival
- Hurricane Eta, a 2020 Category 4 hurricane
- Landolphia owariensis, a vine native to Africa and sometimes known as eta
- 'eta, a letter or glottal stop in the Tahitian languages
- Eta Island (disambiguation)

== See also ==
- Eta function (disambiguation)
- Eta conversion
- Eta invariant
- Eta meson
