= Eta Island =

Eta Island may refer to:

- Eta Island (Palmer Archipelago) in Antarctica
- Eta Island in the Simpson Strait, Canada
- Eta Island, Bermuda in the North Atlantic Ocean
