= Eta (given name) =

Eta is a female given name. Notable people with the name include:

- Eta Boeriu (1923–1984), Romanian writer
- Eta Cohen (1916–2012), English violinist
- Eta Hentz (1895–1986), Hungarian-American fashion designer known as Madame Eta
- Eta Linnemann (1926–2009), German theologian
- Eta Tyrmand (1917–2008), Belarusian composer

== Fictional characters ==
- Eta (イータ), the chief scientist and seventh member of Shadow Garden in the light novel and anime series The Eminence in Shadow

== See also ==
- Etta (given name)
