= Eta function =

In mathematics, eta function may refer to:

- The Dirichlet eta function η(s), a Dirichlet series
- The Dedekind eta function η(τ), a modular form
- The Weierstrass eta function η(w) of a lattice vector
- The eta function η(s) used to define the eta invariant
