= Etta, Virginia =

Unincorporated community in Virginia, United States

Coordinates: 38°08′34″N 77°10′24″W

Etta is an unincorporated community in Caroline County, in the U.S. state of Virginia.
