= Ariens =

American equipment company

AriensCo
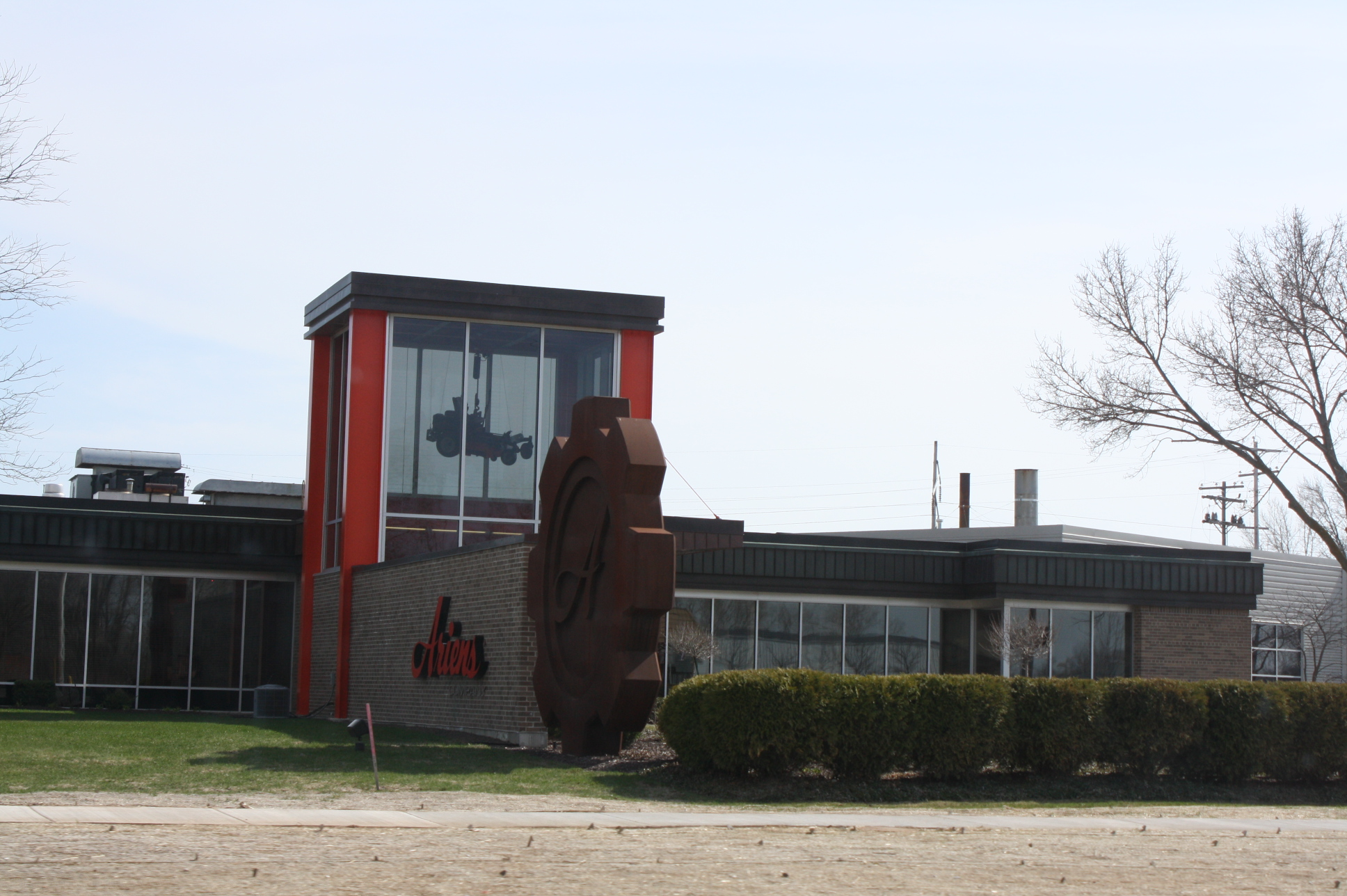
- Corporate Headquarters in Brillion
- Founded: 1933
- Headquarters: Brillion, Wisconsin
- Products: Commercial and residential lawn care and snow removal equipment
- Website: www.AriensCo.com

Ariens Company, stylized as AriensCo, is an American equipment company based in Wisconsin which has a long history manufacturing snow blowers, lawn tractors, and zero-turn lawn mowers for commercial and high-end consumer markets. Ariens touts itself as being the "mower of the White House lawn," "official snow blower of Lambeau Field," and the "King of Snow".

Currently AriensCo dedicates its efforts for the residential lawn and snow markets using the Ariens brand name and dedicates its efforts for the commercial lawn market using the Gravely brand name. Ariens Company has branched into many product development projects over the course of its history. One of the most enduring and successful products has been the Ariens Sno-Thro.

== History ==
=== Snow blowers ===
Ariens Company entered the snow thrower market at the urging of an Ariens distributor in the Northeast who wanted a two-stage snow thrower for home snow removal. Product design began on December 15, 1959, and by March 1960, a prototype was complete. Test models were demonstrated to distributors throughout the Snowbelt. The company started production in July 1960, producing 1,865 units in the introductory season. These first units had issues with their drive systems and had to be replaced with a friction drive system, which is still in use today. The recall put great financial hardship on the company that year, but Ariens survived.

Early Ariens units used a heavy gauge steel blower and rake (auger) design.

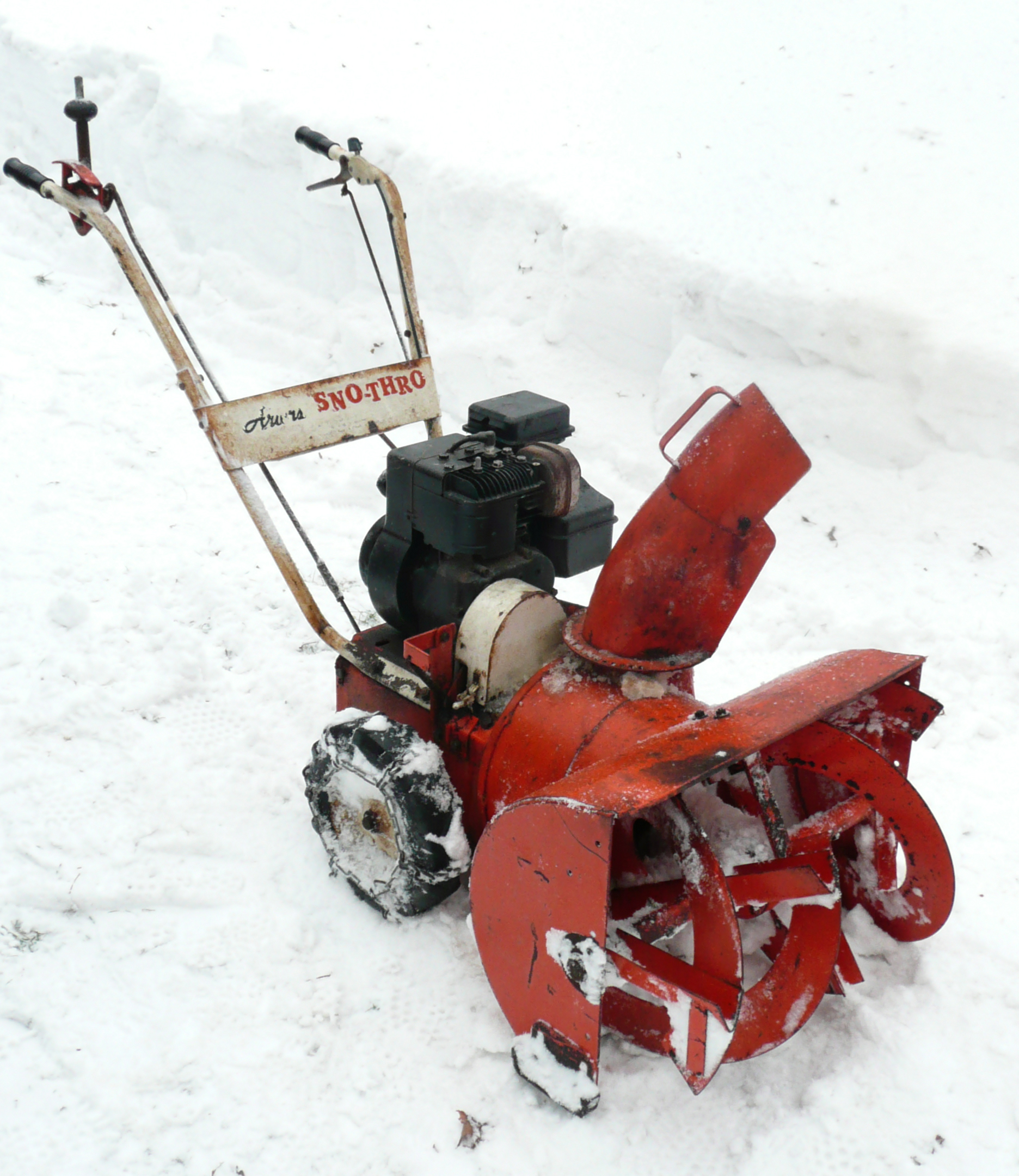
1961 Ariens Sno Thro

Tecumseh engines were used on 95% of Ariens machines from 1960 to 2009. A small percentage used Briggs & Stratton engines and others. In December 2008, Tecumseh began winding down production, and the 2009 model year was the last to receive Tecumseh engines. In 2010 Briggs & Stratton became the main supplier of engines for Ariens machines. A few years later, Liquid Combustion Technology of South Carolina (LCT) purchased the rights to the Tecumseh name and tooling and resumed building engines for snow machines. Base model machines were equipped with LCT engines and more advanced machines were powered by Briggs & Stratton. As of 2016, Ariens Sno-Thro machines are built in the United States, but all engines powering the machines are made in China (save for Briggs and Stratton engines). An electronic fuel injection engine was introduced for the 2017 model year.

By the late 1970s, Ariens produced more than 100,000 Sno-Thro machines each season. In November 2005, the company produced its milestone two millionth Sno-Thro machine. In 2012 Ariens produced its three millionth Sno-Thro and in 2018 Ariens produced its four millionth Sno-Thro and held a public celebration. Ariens products are available at independent power equipment dealers in North America and Europe.

=== Lawn mowers ===
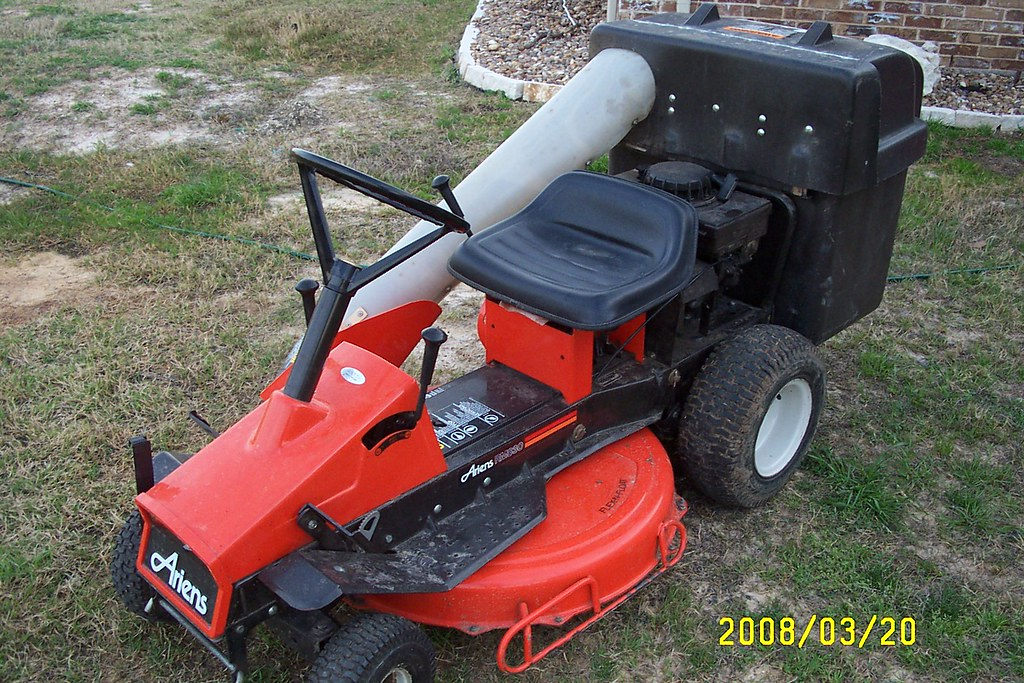
Ariens Riding Mower

Ariens entered the lawn and garden market in 1958 with its first riding lawn mower. In 1963 Ariens built and opened a 23,000 square foot manufacturing plant in Brillion, Wisconsin, to ramp up production. In 1977 Ariens built a new metal fabrication plant in Brillion, Wisconsin. Until 1982 Ariens had focused mainly on the residential mower market, but expanded into the commercial mower market through the acquisition of Gravely Company. Gravely sold identical Ariens mowers with the Gravely name and color.

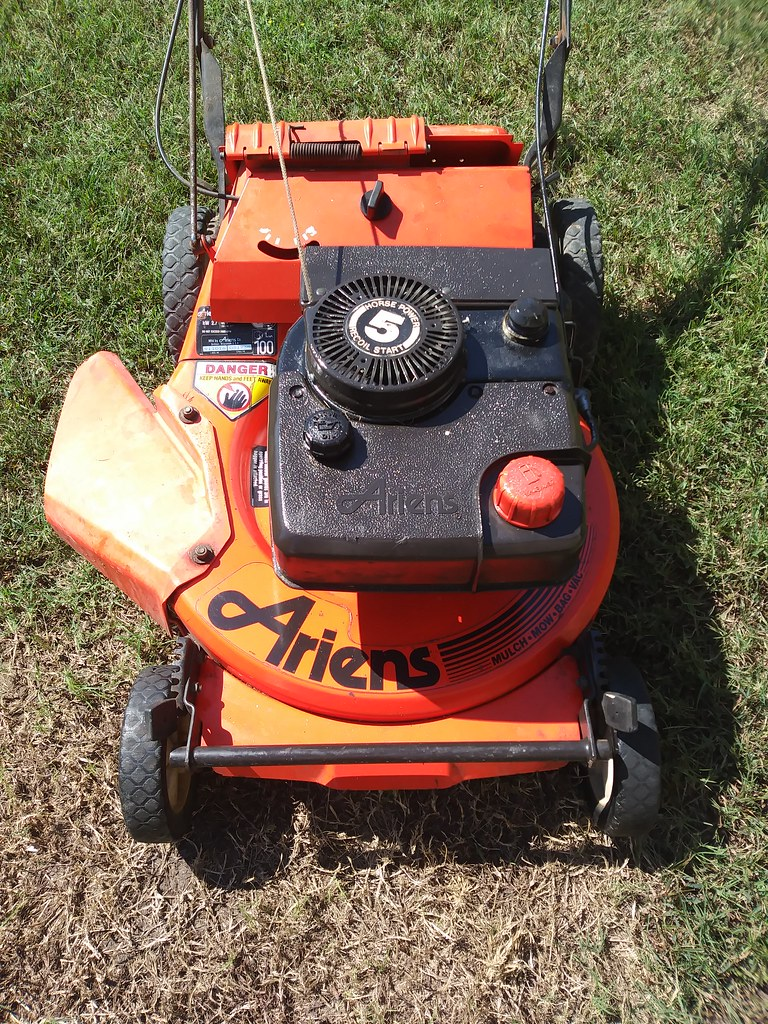
80's Ariens Self Propelled mower. It was also sold as a Gravely mower

Ariens lawn tractors are generally characterized by independent left and right wheel drives. Ariens released an electric lawn mower in April 2009 through its dealer network and at Home Depot. The mower runs for 75 minutes on a single charge.

=== Direct marketing ===
In 2014, Ariens purchased three direct marketing brands, Gempler's, AW Direct and Ben Meadows, to serve customers in niche professional markets. The brands operated as a single entity under Ariens Specialty Brands until 2018 when the company divested from them and eliminated the Ariens Specialty Brands division located in Janesville, Wisconsin.

== Brands ==
AriensCo owns multiple brands but no longer operates all of their brands. AriensCo continues to operate:

- Gravely
- Ariens
- AS-Motor

AriensCo's retired brands:

- Countax
- Westwood
- Sno Tek
- Great Dane
- EverRide
- National Mower
- Locke
- Parker

== Concept store ==
The Ariens concept store, known as Brillion Power Equipment, opened on May 6, 2017. The store is located across the street from Ariens corporate headquarters and sells Ariens, Gravely and Stihl brands.

== AriensCo Museum ==
The AriensCo Museum is located at its original manufacturing plant in Brillion, Wisconsin. Opened in 2003, the museum displays highlights from the company's history and the evolution of the company's products, including tillers, tractors, riding mowers and snow throwers.

The museum offers free tours to students and works with schools in the area to help gain an interest in STEM studies.

The museum has been open to the public since its inception in 2003.
