= Gravely Tractor =

American lawn mower manufacturer

Gravely, of Brillion, Wisconsin, is a manufacturer of powered lawn and garden implements which it describes as "walk-behind, zero turn and outfront mowers". It started as a manufacturer of "walk-behind" or two-wheel tractors.

== History ==
=== Foundation ===
Benjamin Franklin Gravely (29 November 1876 – January 1953) of Dunbar, West Virginia, manufactured in 1916 a hand-pushed plow fitted with an auxiliary Indian motorcycle engine and driven by belts. His goal was to build a tractor which would revolutionize gardening and lawn maintenance for the homeowner.

F. W. Wilcox, a friend of Gravely, owned a machine shop in Middleport, Ohio. He allowed Gravely to build more tractors at his shop. It was there that Gravely designed the engine and built six or seven of the first tractors, which weighed about 190 pounds each. He also developed several new tools for the engine and drive train. His third generation grandson, Shawn Ryder, has his grandfather's Gravely tractor collection in Warrington, Pennsylvania.

=== Incorporation ===
The Gravely company was incorporated in 1922. In the mid-1920s, Gravely decided to build and market the tractors commercially. He and several backers raised enough capital to purchase an old factory in the Dunbar, West Virginia, area that had previously been used for the manufacture of tires. One of the stockholders, Eustace Rose, a close friend and a mechanic, inventor and engineer, collaborated closely in the development of the tractor. Rose is also reputed to have invented the first automatic transmission used by the Chrysler Corporation.

=== Survival and growth ===
Strong sales assured the company's profitability through the Great Depression. Customer loyalty was an important element in this success. In the company's earliest years, Gravely would load several tractors into his Studebaker tourer car and sell them to farms as far away as Florida at $175 each. He would then drive back and pick up another load.

Within a few years, sales outlets had been established from coast to coast, with international sales representatives in Germany, France and Switzerland.

Ben Gravely sold his stock in Gravely Tractor in 1940 and died thirteen years later. His company was gradually acquired by the Studebaker Corporation by 1960 and later sold off by Studebaker-Worthington.

Studebaker purchased Gravely to strengthen the Studebaker Corporation, but decisions that were causing Studebaker to decline also affected Gravely Tractor. With a strong work force at the Dunbar, WV, plant, wages had increased. Studebaker presumed moving the plant to North Carolina would allow them to hire farm workers at a lower wage. They asked the management team to move to the new factory. Building a large facility at Winston-Salem, they made the move. However, in the same area GE built a plant for motors and other units, and a large beer producer built a brewery for their products. They started employees at almost $3.45 per hour which was $1.45 more than Gravely paid at Dunbar and $2.00 per hour more than they had hoped to pay in the new plant. The management then tried to recruit former employees, but only a few went. Most of those returned home within a year. With a lack of workers and other problems, the tractor started to decline. To head off further problems and attempt to save money, they opted to purchase outsourced engines to retrofit on the Gravely tractor. This stopped the production of the Gravely built engine which was simple and efficient. Studebaker eventually got out of Gravely. Due to a large amount of loyal owners, Gravely survived, but did lose much of their large market share to competing companies.

== Product History ==
Not much unlike Gravely's first power driven plow, Gravely today offers two kinds of all-gear "tractors" − walk-behind self-propelled units and zero-turn-radius riding mowers, which evolved out of the durable riding tractors that defined the company for much of its later years.

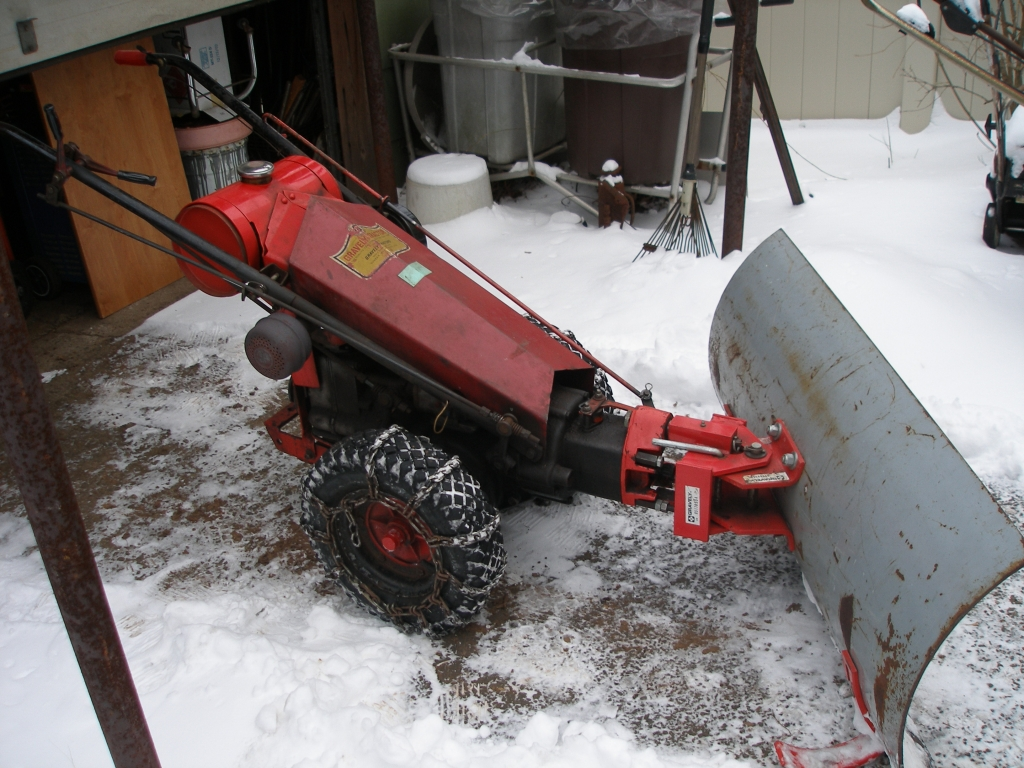
1959 Gravely LI walk behind tractor with Snow Dozer plow

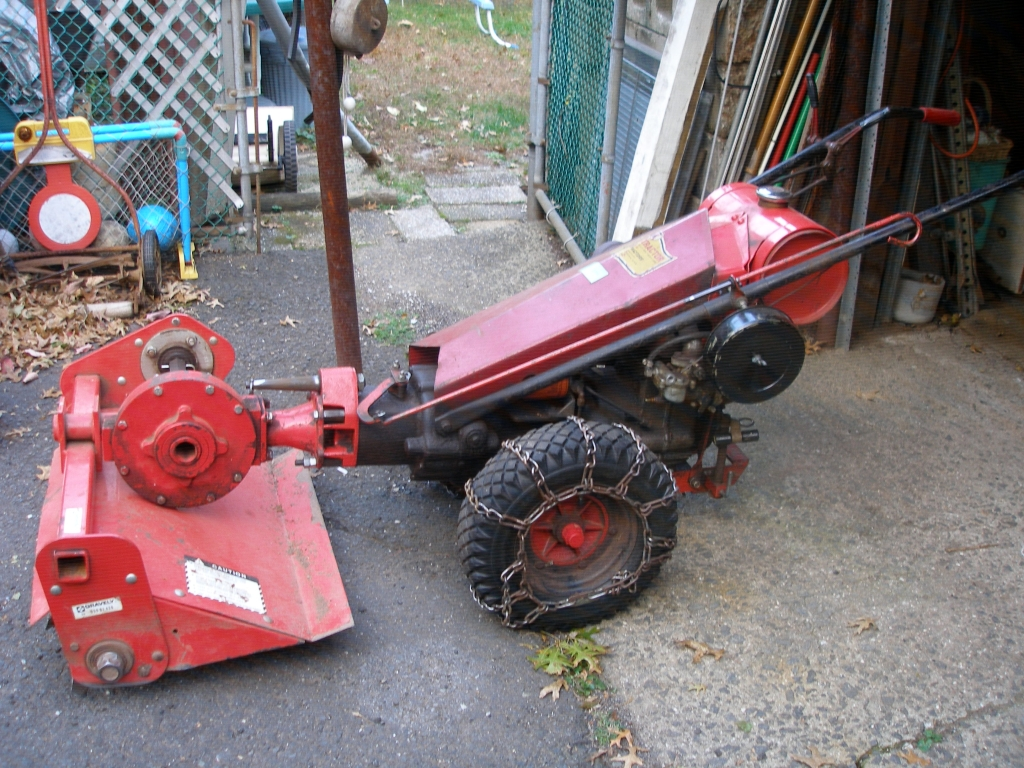
1959 Gravely LI walk behind tractor with front mounted cultivator

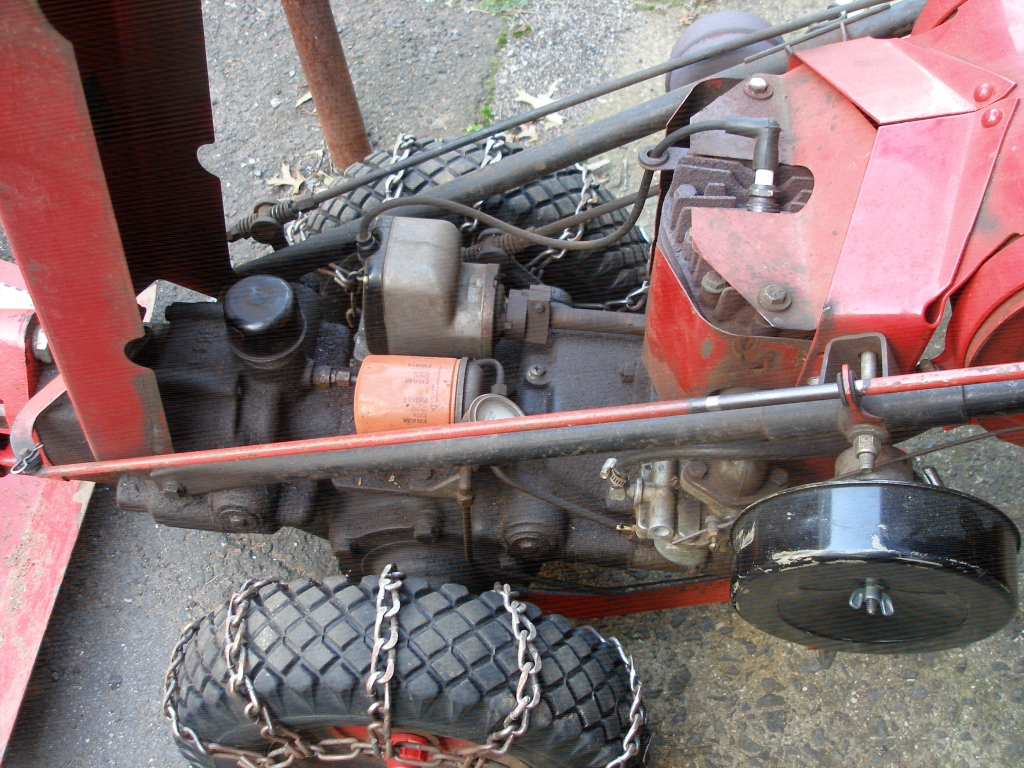
1959 Gravely LI walk behind tractor w/original 6 HP gravely engine

=== Walk-behind ===
The all-gear walk-behind units were powered by a single-cylinder four-stroke engine, available in a one-wheel model D (1916−195?) and the two wheel model L (1936−1966) and the two wheel model C (1967–1976). Variations of all models included bodywork changes, mechanical changes and color changes throughout their production. Visit the Gravely Tractor Club of America for further information.

Earlier models had attachments such as rototillers and flail mowers. Later attachment options included snowblowers, snow blades, and a sprayer. Gravely in the 1970s had 38 attachments, but through innovations of various companies the list expanded to over 80. Sulkies and steering sulkies were available for walk-behind tractors, as well as an optional solid platform with space for carrying small amounts of cargo (trailers).

While it offered walk-behind mowers, brush-cutters and other equipment, by 2014 Gravely no longer produced general-purpose walk-behind tractors.

=== Riding tractors ===
The majority of Gravely riding tractors were, like the walk-behinds, characterized as "all-gear", that is, with a rear-mounted engine mated to a transaxle powering the tractor's rear wheels. This design thus eliminated the need for drive belts to power the tractor forward or backwards. The only belts required on Gravely equipment (with the exception of the 408) is the blade drive belt for its mower decks, which is powered by a gear box on the deck, which receives power from a PTO driveshaft connected to the tractor's drivetrain. The tractor's direction is controlled by a lever to the right of the operator for forward, neutral, or reverse operation. Because of this, this tractor is often mistaken for having a hydrostatic drive.

In 1965, Kelly G. Cunningham used the Gravely 7.6 tractor to create the Terramite Model 1 compact backhoe, now known as the T1.

In 1967, Gravely introduced its 400 series riding tractors, with the all-gear drivetrain that would come to define the company in future years.

The tractor had four speeds, two in low range and two in high range, with power configurations of single-cylinder 10, 12, or 14 horsepower Kohler or Onan engines. In 1969 was the debut of the 16.5 HP Onan CCKA twin-cylinder powered Commercial 450, the most powerful tractor the company offered at the time. The commercial-grade units were painted a characteristic yellow and white, while the home-use units were painted red and white.

The 400 series was produced until 1971, when Gravely introduced its replacement: the 800 series tractors, which gained popularity in the consumer market. This tractor had eight speeds, with four speeds each in low and high range, with engine options ranging from a cast-iron 10 horsepower Kohler single-cylinder, to an 18-horsepower cast-aluminum twin-cylinder Onan. The 800 series was replaced with the 8000 series by 1978, which offered more powerful engine configurations and an improved hydraulic lift option, yet retained the eight-speed transaxle. Many of the parts for the 800 and 8000 series designs, excepting the engine, are the same or compatible, and are readily available as new and used parts online, in a rather impressive after-market.

The 8000 series remained in production until 1987, when it was replaced by the professional-grade "G" series. The G series ended production in 2004.

The eight-speed transaxle was standard on all 800 and 8000 series tractors, with the engine being the only major difference. The design of the drive clutches was visibly changed to a simpler arrangement around the early 1980s; the two designs are generally interchangeable. The rear-engine mounting and simple construction allowed Gravely owners to service and even upgrade their engines on their own.

Gravely also released an economy version of tractor in 1970, featuring a belt-driven 4-speed transmission and eight-horsepower (Kohler) engine, known as the 408. The engine was mounted at the front. This did not sell nearly as well as the popular all-gear units and was discontinued in 1977, when it was replaced with a heavy-duty professional grade of tractor known as the 900 series. Another tractor of this type, called the 9000 series was also released later that same year and replaced the 900 the following year until production ended in 1982. This tractor, much larger than the 8000 series and its predecessors, was equipped with a 27-horsepower I-4 water-cooled Continental engine.

== Gravely today ==
In 2004 Gravely produced its last Gravely two-wheeled tractor. As of 2006, Gravely provided a full line of power lawn implements, including zero-turn mowers, reel mowers, and grass trimmers. In 2008, Gravely launched Gravely Turf Equipment, a division geared toward golf courses and turf management nationwide. Gravely was purchased by AriensCo located in Brillion, Wisconsin, in 1982. Today the Gravely brand operates as the commercial lawn division of AriensCo and its products continue to be sold exclusively through its dealer network. Gravely celebrated the 100th anniversary of Benjamin Gravely's plow patent in 2016.
