= Etta D. Pisano =

American breast imaging researcher

- Born: New York City, USA
- Spouse: Jan Kylstra
- Children: 4

Academic background
- Education: AB, Philosophy, 1979, Dartmouth College; MD, 1983, Duke University School of Medicine

Etta Driscoll Pisano is an American breast imaging researcher. She is a professor in residence of radiology at the Beth Israel Deaconess Medical Center and chief research dean at the American College of Radiology. In 2008, she was elected a member of the National Academy of Medicine.

== Early life and education ==
Pisano was born in New York City but raised in the suburbs of Philadelphia. She grew up the oldest of seven children and after her mother died when she was a teenager, decided to pursue a career in medicine. Her father, a radiologist, frequently took her around his hospital and introduced her to the women doctors working there. Pisano received her Bachelor of Arts degree in Philosophy from Dartmouth College before enrolling at the Duke University School of Medicine. When discussing with her guidance counsellor about medical school options, she was informed that she was "wasting her time" due to her gender. She ignored the advice and applied to both medical and law schools, being accepted into every one including Harvard Law. She chose to attend Duke and earned membership into the Alpha Omega Alpha Society, where she also met and married her husband Jan Kylstra. Pisano completed her medical residency in radiology at the Beth Israel Deaconess Medical Center (BIDMC) and served as their Chief of Breast Imaging and Instructor in Radiology for one year.

== Career ==
Pisano left Beth Israel to become an assistant professor in radiology at the UNC School of Medicine in 1989 and served as their Chief of Breast Imaging until 2005. In her last year as chief, Pisano was the principal investigator of the Digital Mammographic Imaging Screening Trial, a study on the importance of digital mammography for young women. She led cancer studies across the United States, Canada, and Germany which found that digital mammography is more accurate in women under the age of 50. Upon stepping down as chief, Pisano was appointed the vice dean for academic affairs and granted the title of Kenan Professor of Radiology and Biomedical Engineering. She was later named the inaugural director of UNC's Center for Research Excellence in Breast Cancer Imaging in 2007. The following year, she was named the principal investigator of a five-year Clinical and Translational Science Award grant after Paul Watkins stepped down. As a result of her research, Pisano was elected a member of the National Academy of Medicine that same year. Pisano ended her tenure at UNC in 2010 by accepting a deanship and vice president position at the Medical University of South Carolina (MUSC). She became the first female to lead the MUSC College of Medicine and one of the few women who are deans of medical schools in the country.

Pisano worked at MUSC from 2010 until 2014, when she stepped down to focus on breast cancer imaging research. At the time, she was considered one of the top 10 experts in women's imaging and one of the 20 most influential people in radiology. The following year, Pisano was appointed the vice-chair of Research in the Department of Radiology at her alma mater, BIDMC. In this role, she led the first randomized trial to compare two types of digital mammography for breast cancer screening. In 2017, she was named the American College of Radiology's (ACR) chief science officer of their Center for Research and Innovation. Pisano stayed in this role for one year before becoming the ACR's first female chief research officer.

== Personal life ==
Pisano and her husband have four children together.
