= Etta C. Gravely =

American chemist

- Born: August 30, 1939 (age 87); North Carolina, United States
- Education: Howard University; North Carolina A&T State University; University of North Carolina at Greensboro
- Scientific career
- Fields: Chemistry education
- Workplaces: North Carolina A&T State University
- Thesis: Alternative Schooling in North Carolina 1977-1981 (1982)
- Doctoral advisor: Dwight Clark

Etta Christine Leath Gravely (born August 30, 1939) is an associate professor of chemistry education at North Carolina A&T State University in Greensboro, North Carolina.

== Early life and education ==
Gravely was born in Alamance County, North Carolina on August 30, 1939. Her mother, Kate Lee McBroom was a homemaker and house cleaner. Her father, Rufus Leath, served in the army in World War II and later worked as an orderly in a hospital.

She was inspired to study chemistry by her high school teachers, although her segregated all-Black school lacked necessary lab equipment. Gravely attend Howard University in Washington, D.C. and received a Bachelor of Science degree in chemistry 1960. There she joined the Alpha Kappa Alpha sorority and continued to be active with the organization throughout her career.

== Career ==
After graduation, she moved to Greensboro, North Carolina with her husband. There she struggled to find employment in chemistry, so she went back to school to receive a teaching license. She taught at Dudley High School, the only Black high school in Greensboro, from 1962 to 1966. She went back to North Carolina A&T State University first completing a Master of Science degree in education with a concentration in chemistry, and then finishing a second Master of Science in chemistry. Gravely returned to teach at Dudley High School, leaving after the birth of her third child in 1969.

In 1970 she began a PhD program in textiles at the University of North Carolina at Greensboro, but left after one year after experiencing what she felt was racial discrimination.

In 1972 she began teaching physical chemistry and physical science courses at North Carolina A&T State University. From 1978-81 she received a Doctoral Study Assignment Program grant, which gave faculty members at traditionally Black institutions of higher learning in North Carolina, who did not hold a terminal degree, funding to complete doctorates. Gravely received an Ed.D. degree in Curriculum and Teaching from the University of North Carolina at Greensboro in 1982.

After completing her Ed.D., Gravely continued to teach at North Carolina A&T State University, serving on both the curriculum committee in the chemistry department and the state-wide University of North Carolina Faculty Assembly. She also worked on the teacher education council for the state of North Carolina to develop pre-K-12 curriculum for the Department of Public Instruction.

Gravely has held several leadership positions in the Central North Carolina Section of the American Chemical Society and served on the Women Chemists Committee of the American Chemical Society for ten years.

In 2017 she was inducted as American Chemical Society Fellow, "for 50 years of contributing to innovative chemistry pedagogy for precollege and college students."

== Personal life ==
Etta Gravely married Clinton Eugene Gravely, an architect, in 1960. They had four children. Her son Clinton Jr. died of leukemia in 1976 at age 11. She is a member of the Shiloh Baptist Church and chaired the Deaconess board for 27 years.
