= Ette =

Ette may refer to:

- Ette (river), a river of Baden-Württemberg, Germany
- Ette people, indigenous people in Colombia
- Ette language, language of the Ette people in Colombia
- Exotic Tropic Timber Enterprises, a company in Liberia
- Bernard Etté (1898–1973), German jazz and light music violinist and conductor
- Ottmar Ette (born 1956), Professor of Romance languages and Comparative literature at the University of Potsdam, Germany
- Carla J. Easton, a musician who released her first solo album under the name Ette
- -ette, a diminutive suffix
