= Transhumanist Bill of Rights =

Crowdsourced document

The Transhumanist Bill of Rights is a crowdsourced document that conveys rights and laws to humans and all sapient entities while specifically targeting future scenarios of humanity. The original version was created by transhumanist US presidential candidate Zoltan Istvan and was posted by Zoltan on the wall of the United States Capitol building on December 14, 2015.

== History ==
In act reminiscent of Martin Luther, Zoltan Istvan was filmed writing the Transhumanist Bill of Rights on steps of the US Supreme Court on December 13, 2015. The following day, while being surrounded and warned by Capitol police he was going to be arrested for trespassing, Zoltan posted the one-page bill to the northside wall of the US Capitol, an act which is partially documented in the documentary Immortality or Bust. The bill quickly fell off the building.

Version 2.0 was published in Wired magazine by Bruce Sterling. By the time Version 3.0 was published in December 2018, the document had quadrupled in size from version 1.0. Versions 2.0 and 3.0 were developed using electronic ranked-preference voting that involved the members of the U.S. Transhumanist Party proposing articles and then selecting among the proposed wordings.

Istvan has spoken about the bill at the World Economic Forum (Global Council Meeting), Congreso Futuro, the World Bank, and the US Navy.

== Content ==
The most current version of the Transhumanist Bill of Rights focuses protecting the rights of: Human beings; genetically modified humans beings; cyborgs; digital intelligences; intellectually enhanced, previously non-sapient animals; any species of plant or animal which has been enhanced to possess the capacity for intelligent thought; and other advanced sapient life forms. The section on morphological freedom has received particular attention in both the press and scholarly literature.

The Transhumanist Bill of Rights has been widely discussed - major media has published information on it, books have discussed it, and academics have written papers about it. Its 43 articles cover items such as the right to abolish all suffering, the right for morphological freedom, the right to universal basic income and healthcare, the right to strive for radical life extension, and the legal requirement for sentient entities to protect themselves against existential risk. To help guard against existential risk and ensure a bright future for humanity article 5 of the bill mandates that governments "take all reasonable measures to embrace and fund space travel". The bill also requires aging to be classified as a disease by all governments.

== Criticism ==
In an article at The American Spectator titled a “A Transhumanist Bill of Wrongs” perennial transhumanist critic Wesley Smith argued that the laws in the Transhumanist Bill of Rights would cost too much and harm human exceptionalism. Dr. Michael Cook questions why transhumanists even need a bill of rights, and, instead, asks whether society would need a bill of rights against transhumanists and their goals. When critiquing Version 2.0 of the Bill, Michael Cook along with commentator Jasper Hammill of The Metro erroneously assumed that when Article IV references a right to "ending involuntary suffering", it was referring to euthanasia. As U.S. Transhumanist party chair Gennady Stolyarov II has explained, no such implication was intended and the text is actually a reference to David Pearce’s idea that suffering itself should be abolished for entities who desire this, as expressed in his philosophy of abolitionism.

== Text of Version 1.0 ==
Preamble: Whereas science and technology are now radically changing human beings and may also create future forms of advanced sapient and sentient life, transhumanists establish this TRANSHUMANIST BILL OF RIGHTS to help guide and enact sensible policies in the pursuit of life, liberty, security of person, and happiness.

Article 1. Human beings, sentient artificial intelligences, cyborgs, and other advanced sapient life forms are entitled to universal rights of ending involuntary suffering, making personhood improvements, and achieving an indefinite lifespan via science and technology.

Article 2. Under penalty of law, no cultural, ethnic, or religious perspectives influencing government policy can impede life extension science, the health of the public, or the possible maximum amount of life hours citizens possess.

Article 3. Human beings, sentient artificial intelligences, cyborgs, and other advanced sapient life forms agree to uphold morphological freedom—the right to do with one’s physical attributes or intelligence (dead, alive, conscious, or unconscious) whatever one wants so long as it doesn’t hurt anyone else.

Article 4. Human beings, sentient artificial intelligences, cyborgs, and other advanced sapient life forms will take every reasonable precaution to prevent existential risk, including those of rogue artificial intelligence, asteroids, plagues, weapons of mass destruction, bioterrorism, war, and global warming, among others.

Article 5. All nations and their governments will take all reasonable measures to embrace and fund space travel, not only for the spirit of adventure and to gain knowledge by exploring the universe, but as an ultimate safeguard to its citizens and transhumanity should planet Earth become uninhabitable or be destroyed.

Article 6. Involuntary aging shall be classified as a disease. All nations and their governments will actively seek to dramatically extend the lives and improve the health of its citizens by offering them scientific and medical technologies to overcome involuntary aging.
