= Alan Winfield =

British engineer and educator

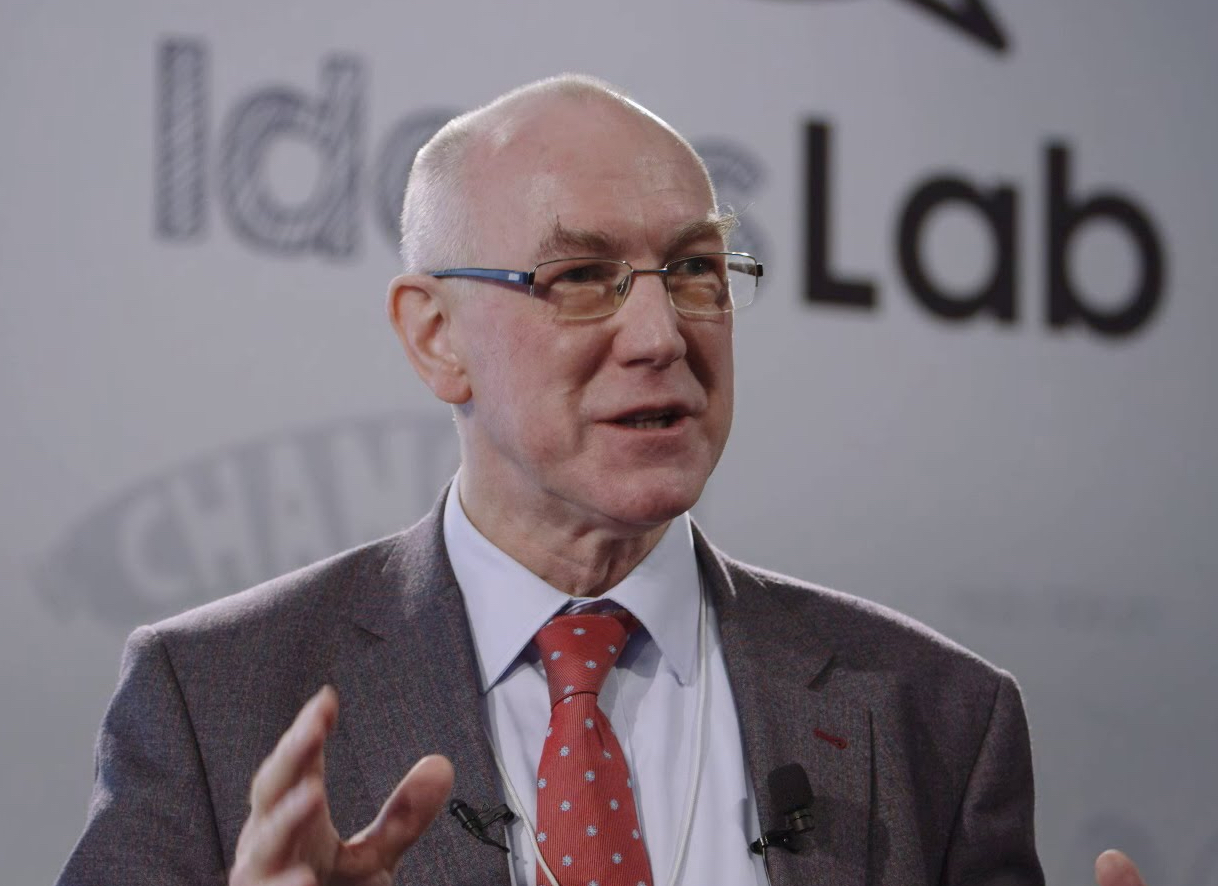
- Winfield in 2016
- Born: 1956 (age 69–70); Burton upon Trent, UK
- Education: University of Hull
- Scientific career
- Fields: Cognitive robotics; Robot ethics; AI ethics
- Workplaces: University of Hull; UWE Bristol
- Thesis: Maximum-Likelihood Sequential Decoding of Convolutional Error-Correcting Codes (1984)
- Doctoral advisor: Dr Rodney Goodman
- Website: https://people.uwe.ac.uk/Person/AlanWinfield

Alan Winfield CEng (born 1956) is a British engineer and educator. He is Professor Emeritus of Robot Ethics at UWE Bristol, Honorary Professor at the University of York, and Associate Fellow in the Cambridge Centre for the Future of Intelligence. He chairs the advisory board of the Responsible Technology Institute, University of Oxford.

Winfield is known for research in swarm robotics, robots modelling cultural evolution, and self-modelling (including ethical) robots. He is also known for advocacy and standards development in robot and AI ethics, and for proposing that all robots should be equipped with the equivalent of a flight data recorder.

== Early life and education ==
Winfield was born in Burton upon Trent where he attended Burton Grammar School. He studied electronic engineering for both BSc and PhD, majoring in telecommunications, at the University of Hull from 1974 to 1984. Following his first degree he won an SERC scholarship for doctoral study in the field of information theory and error-correcting codes under the supervision of Rodney Goodman.

== Career ==
Winfield's first faculty appointment was as lecturer in the department of electronic engineering at the University of Hull, from 1981 to 1984. During this period he wrote a guide to the programming language Forth, The Complete Forth, Wiley, 1983. Winfield also invented an architecture for executing native Forth at machine level.

In 1984 Winfield resigned his lectureship and founded, with Rod Goodman, Metaforth Computer Systems Ltd, with the aim of commercializing the Forth machine.

In 1992 Winfield was appointed Hewlett-Packard Professor of Electronic Engineering and Associate Dean (Research) at UWE, Bristol, where he co-founded the Bristol Robotics Laboratory. From 2009 to 2016 he was director of UWE's Science Communication Unit.

Winfield is a member of the editorial boards of the Journal of Experimental and Theoretical Artificial Intelligence, and the Journal of AI and Ethics. He is also an associate editor of Frontiers Robotics and AI.

== Public engagement ==
From 2006 to 2009, with Noel Sharkey, Owen Holland and Frank Burnet, Winfield led public engagement project Walking with Robots. The project was designed to encourage children into science and technology careers, and to involve the public in discussions about robotics research issues. In 2010 Walking with Robots was awarded the Royal Academy of Engineering Rooke Medal for public promotion of engineering.

In 2009 Winfield won an EPSRC Senior Media Fellowship to support and develop his engagement with the press and media. During the fellowship Winfield wrote popular science book Robotics: A Very Short Introduction, Oxford University Press, 2012.

Winfield has given public lectures and panel debates including: British Academy debate 'Does AI pose a threat to society?' with Maja Pantic, Samantha Payne and Christian List chaired by Claire Craig, lectures and Q&A with Raja Chatila at the Royal Institution, talks and Q&A with Ron Arkin and Paul Mason at 'Smarter Together': Why AI Needs Human-Choice? in Seoul, the CaSE Annual Lecture with Jim Al-Khalili and Wendy Hall, Institute of Physics, and the keynote lecture for the 15th Appleton Space Conference at the Rutherford Appleton Laboratory.

In February 2017 Winfield was a guest of Jim Al-Khalili on BBC Radio 4's The Life Scientific, and in October 2017 he was interviewed by Stephen Sackur for BBC TV HARDtalk.

== Robot and AI Ethics ==
In 2010 Winfield was a part of a cross-disciplinary group that drafted the EPSRC/AHRC Principles of Robotics. Inspired by Asimov's Laws of robotics, the principles take the position that "robots are simply tools, for which humans must take responsibility". In 2012 Winfield joined the British Standards Institute working group on robot ethics which drafted BS 8611:2016 Robots and robotic devices: Guide to the ethical design and application of robots and robotic systems.

From 2015 to 2018 Winfield was a member of the Ethics Advisory Board of the EU Human Brain Project. Between 2016 and 2018 he served as a member of the World Economic Forum Global Futures Council on Technology Values and Policy. Winfield has given evidence to both Commons and Lords select committee inquiries on Artificial Intelligence in the UK parliament. He served as an expert advisor to the NHS Health Education England Topol Review Preparing the healthcare workforce to deliver the digital future.

In 2016 Winfield joined the IEEE Global Initiative on ethics of Intelligence and Autonomous Systems. As chair of the General Principles group he helped to draft Ethically Aligned Design. He is a member of the initiative's executive committee, and chaired the working group that drafted IEEE Standard 7001-2021 on Transparency of Autonomous Systems. Winfield received an IEEE Special Recognition Award in 2021.

His work has been reported by the BBC, New Scientist, The Guardian, The Telegraph, Nature, and Scientific American.

=== Selected publications ===
- Winfield AFT and Blackmore S. (2021) Experiments in artificial culture: from noisy imitation to storytelling robots. Phil. Trans. Royal. Soc. B 377: 20200323.
- Winfield AF, Michael K, Pitt J and Evers V (2019) Machine Ethics: The Design and Governance of Ethical AI and Autonomous Systems, Proceedings of the IEEE, vol. 107, no. 3, pp. 509–517.
- Winfield A. (2019) Ethical standards in robotics and AI. Nature Electronics 2, 46–48.
- Winfield AFT and Jirotka M (2018), Ethical Governance is essential to building Trust in Robotic Systems, Phil. Trans. Royal Soc. A, 376: 20180085.
- Vanderelst D and Winfield AF. (2018) An architecture for ethical robots inspired by the simulation theory of cognition. Cognitive Systems Research, 48. pp. 56–66.
- Erbas MD, Bull L and Winfield AFT (2015), On the Evolution of Behaviours through Embodied Imitation, Artificial Life, 21 (2), 141–165, MIT Press.
- Krause J, Winfield AFT, and Deneubourg J-L (2011), Interactive robots in experimental biology, Trends in Ecology & Evolution, 26 (7).
- Liu W and Winfield AFT (2010). A Macroscopic Probabilistic Model for Collective Foraging with Adaptation, International Journal of Robotics Research, 29 (14), 1743–1760.
- Winfield AFT, Liu W, Nembrini J and Martinoli A (2008), Modelling a Wireless Connected Swarm of Mobile Robots, Swarm Intelligence, 2 (2–4), 241–266.
