= Immortality Bus =

1978 Wanderlodge

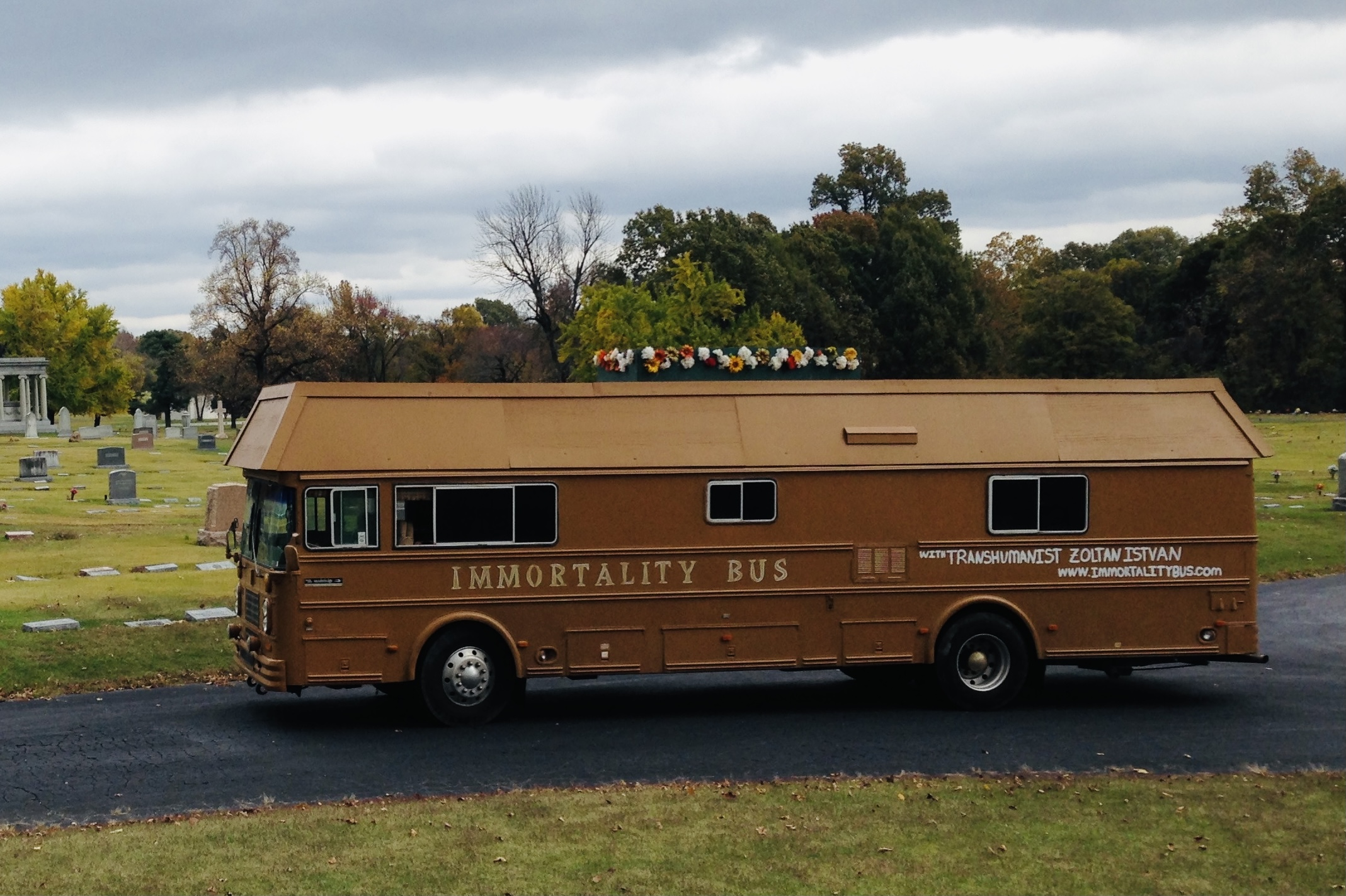
The Immortality Bus

The Immortality Bus is a 1978 Wanderlodge that has been made to appear as a 38-foot brown coffin.

The bus was used by Zoltan Istvan and various other transhumanist activists during his 2016 US presidential campaign to deliver a Transhumanist Bill of Rights to the US Capitol and to promote the idea that death can be conquered by science. The nearly four-month journey of the art vehicle from San Francisco to Washington, DC in 2015 had embedded journalists and documentarians, including those from The New York Times, Der Spiegel, The Verge, The Telegraph, and others.

On board the bus were drones, virtual reality gear, a 4-foot robot named Jethro Knights, biohacking equipment, posters about transhumanism, and nootropics for riders to try. An open invitation to anyone in America was made to travel on the bus. The Immortality Bus has become one of the most widely recognized life extension activist projects and has been featured in several documentaries and articles on the history of the life extensionist movement.

== Journey ==
After a successful crowd funding campaign of $27,380 on Indiegogo, Zoltan Istvan bought the 1978 Wanderlodge in Sacramento, California. In his front yard in Mill Valley, California, he and his team converted the bus into an art vehicle that resembled a 38-foot casket, including plastic flowers on top.

The Immortality Bus left the San Francisco Bay Area on September 5, 2015. It headed to Tehachipi, California where it attended GrindFest, and riders of the bus, including Vox’s Dylan Matthews and Zoltan Istvan were implanted with microchips. From there the bus headed to Las Vegas, then San Diego, and then Arizona to visit life extension group People Unlimited and the Alcor cryonics facility.

After visiting Alcor the bus traveled to Texas for campaign events and then went to Arkansas to protest against marijuana prohibition. It stopped at events in Mississippi before illegally entering a megachurch in Alabama where activists handed out pamphlets on transhumanism. In Alabama it also visited the historic Freedom Riders museum, where Zoltan argued that cyborg rights will be another upcoming civil rights battle.

In Charlotte, North Carolina, John McAfee (then the Presidential candidate of the Cyber Party) visited the bus and debated Zoltan Istvan.

The Immortality Bus team later made speeches at Florida's Church of Perpetual Life (co-founded by William Faloon), and Zoltan lectured using his avatar in Second Life as part of a virtual event with Terasem.

In its final stages, the bus traversed up the eastern seaboard before arriving on November 14, 2015, to the US Capitol. On the steps of the Supreme Court, Zoltan Istvan wrote the original Transhumanist Bill of Rights before posting it on the US Capitol on November 15. Improved versions of the Transhumanist Bill of Rights have since been made via internet crowdsourcing organized by the Transhumanist Party, with version 2.0 published in 2017 and version 3.0 published in 2018.

== After the journey ==
Once a relatively unknown candidate, the Immortality Bus and the media coverage it generated helped Zoltan Istvan place 4th (behind John McAfee, Gary Johnson, and Jill Stein) in an iQuanti survey of Google searches of all Presidential candidates not Democratic or Republican.

In a feature article on the bus, The New York Times Magazine called the Immortality Bus “the great brown sarcaphogaus of the American Highway. It was a methaphor of life itself.” Short video stories of the Immortality Bus were made by The Atlantic, CNET, BuzzFeed, Vocativ, RT, and Australia's Viceland.

Pulitzer Prize winning journalist Jonathan Weiner wrote that the journey of the Immortality Bus is modeled after Ken Kesey and the Merry Pranksters famous cross country bus trip, which helped inspire a generation of activists. The Immortality Bus is the subject of the closing chapter of the Wellcome Prize winning book by Mark O’Connel, To Be a Machine, and also the subject of a chapter in Radicals by Jamie Bartlett.

The documentary Immortality or Bust , which focused on the Immortality Bus campaign, won the breakout award at the 2019 Raw Science Film Festival in Los Angeles as well as the Best Biohacking Awareness Award at the 2021 GeekFest Toronto. Independent distributor Gravitas picked up the documentary and the film is available on iTunes and Amazon Prime.

The bus is currently parked in long-term storage in Virginia, and Zoltan Istvan is working to donate the bus to a museum that will use it to promote life extension.

== Criticism ==
Some transhumanists were dismayed with the amount of media attention the Immortality Bus received. They believed it was a stunt and sent a frivolous message about the seriousness of the life extension movement. Other transhumanists countered that such activism helps grow the movement and raise awareness. USA Today called the bus "a morbid Oscar Meyer Wienermobile".
