= The Transhumanist Wager =

2013 science fiction novel by Zoltan Istvan

- Author: Zoltan Istvan
- Language: English
- Genre: Science fiction, philosophical fiction
- Publisher: Self-published
- Publication date: 2013
- Publication place: United States
- Media type: Paperback, ebook
- ISBN: 978-0-9886161-1-0

The Transhumanist Wager is a 2013 science fiction novel by American author Zoltan Istvan. The novel follows the life of Jethro Knights, a philosopher whose efforts to promote transhumanism ultimately lead to a global revolution. It was a first-place winner in visionary fiction at the International Book Awards.

== Plot ==
Protagonist Jethro Knights studies philosophy and sails around the world to promote indefinite life extension, desiring to live eternally through medicine, science, and technology. Love-interest and physician Zoe Bach, while sharing Knights' philosophical transhumanism, challenges him with her absolute belief in the afterlife, insisting that death is a part of life. Meanwhile, in America, transhumanists are being targeted and killed by Christian terrorists in cahoots with the popular anti-transhumanist Reverend Belinas.

After his sailing trip, Knights suffers a devastating personal tragedy at the hands of Christian fundamentalists. At the same time, the United States Government becomes more theocratic and criminalizes transhumanist research, prompting Knights to build an independent floating city and sovereign state, Transhumania, so research can be continued. Governments around the world eventually grow afraid of the radical science being created on Transhumania, and attack the seasteading city. Transhumania successfully defends itself, and Knights attempts to establish a transhuman-inspired civilization.

== Reception ==
Appraisals of the novel have been mostly positive. Additionally, the subject matter has been enthusiastically received by sites focusing on topics such as the singularity, artificial intelligence, and futurist issues. Reviewers have compared protagonist Jethro Knights to the character John Galt, from Ayn Rand's novel Atlas Shrugged. Others have compared Istvan's book to Robert Pirsig's philosophical novel Zen and the Art of Motorcycle Maintenance or to Robert A. Heinlein's works.

The Transhumanist Wager has been widely debated among futurists and has helped popularize transhumanism.

The book has also been criticized by some transhumanists as being overtly libertarian, anti-egalitarian, and totalitarian, while agreeing with the aim of life extension and admiring the power of the protagonist. Istvan himself admits that in some ways Jethro arguably goes too far, and that a main purpose of writing the book was to start a discussion in the general public about life extension and transhumanism.

== Philosophy ==
The book introduces the philosophy TEF (Teleological Egocentric Functionalism), Istvan's Three Laws of Transhumanism, and the concept of making a Transhumanist Wager. TEF aims to establish a nonreligious and stronger moral system in people and society needed to successfully contend with coming technological change. Istvan states:

TEF is predicated on logic, a simple wager that every human faces:

If a reasoning human being loves and values life, they will want to live as long as possible—the desire to be immortal. Nevertheless, it's impossible to know if they're going to be immortal once they die. To do nothing doesn't help the odds of attaining immortality—since it seems evident that everyone will die someday and possibly cease to exist. To try to do something scientifically constructive towards ensuring immortality beforehand is the most logical conclusion.

Istvan's Three Laws of Transhumanism are:

1. A transhumanist must safeguard one's own existence above all else.
2. A transhumanist must strive to achieve omnipotence as expediently as possible—so long as one's actions do not conflict with the First Law.
3. A transhumanist must safeguard value in the universe—so long as one's actions do not conflict with the First and Second Laws.

== See also ==
- Clarke's three laws
- Ending Aging
- Ethics of artificial intelligence
- Friendliness Theory – a theory which states that, rather than using "Laws", intelligent machines should be programmed to be inherently altruistic, and then to use their own best judgement in how to carry out this altruism, thus sidestepping the problem of how to account for a vast number of unforeseeable eventualities.
- Military robots which may be designed such that they violate Asimov's First Law.
- Niven's laws
- Roboethics
- Three Laws of Robotics
- Tilden's Law of Robotics
