= Catrin Misselhorn =

German philosopher (born 1970)

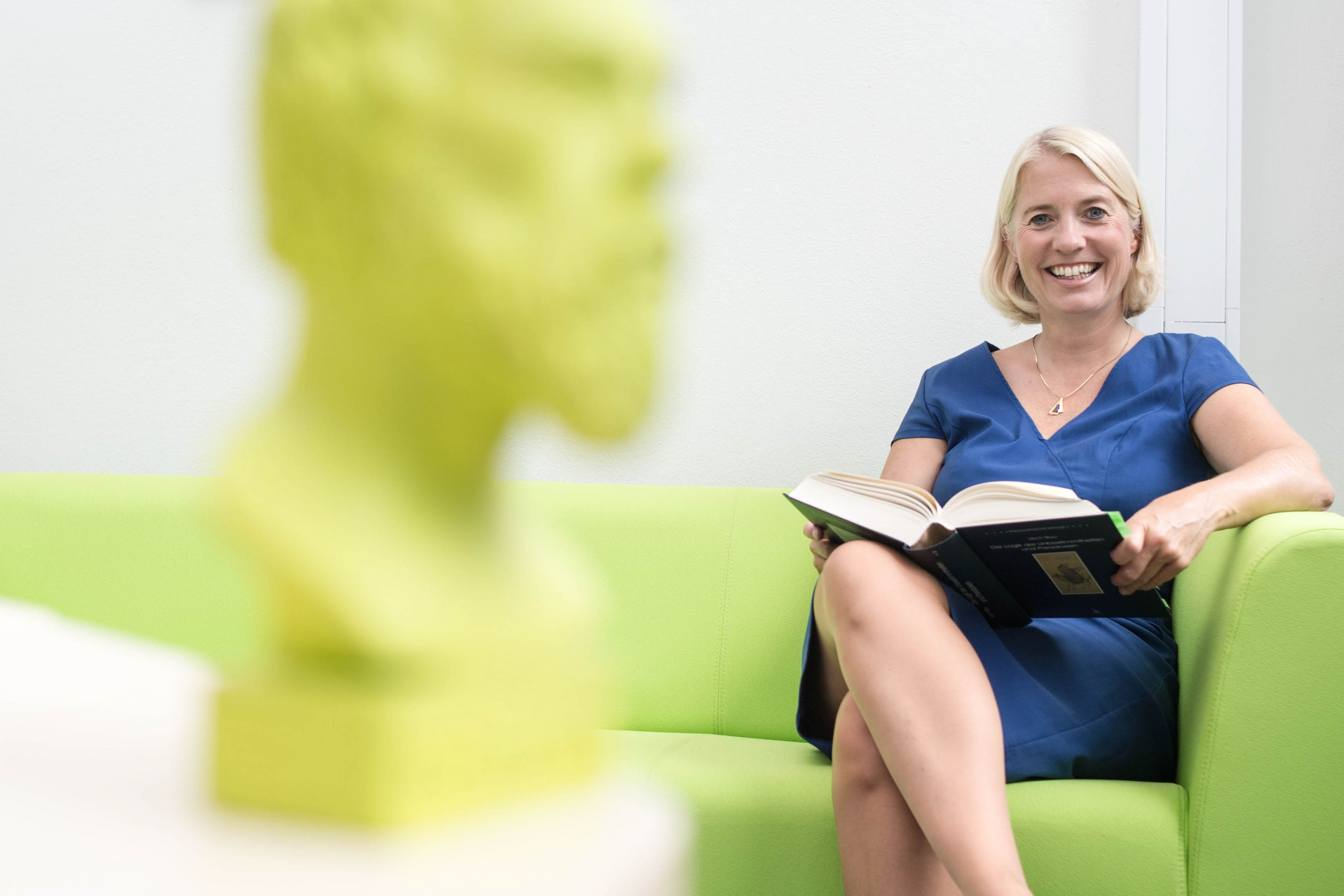
- Born: 1 November 1970 (age 56); Stuttgart (Germany)
- Occupation: philosopher
- Known for: Uncanny Valley

Catrin Misselhorn (1 November 1970 in Stuttgart) is a German philosopher and, since April 2019, a professor at the Georg August University of Göttingen. She is considered a leading thinker in the field of machine and robot ethics in Germany.

== Biography ==
From 2007 to 2008, she was a Feodor Lynen Fellow of the Alexander von Humboldt Foundation at the Center of Affective Sciences in Geneva, as well as at the Collège de France and the Institut Jean Nicod for Cognitive Sciences in Paris. Afterwards, she researched and taught at the University of Zurich, the Humboldt University of Berlin, and the University of Tübingen, where she earned her doctorate in 2003 and completed her Habilitation as an assistant at the chair of Manfred Frank in 2010.

From 2012 to 2019, she held the Chair of Philosophy of Science and Philosophy of Technology at the University of Stuttgart. Since April 2019, Catrin Misselhorn has been teaching philosophy at the Georg August University of Göttingen.

There, Misselhorn discovered the philosophy of artificial intelligence and robot ethics as fields of research for herself and presented her first publications in this area, which bridged the gap between the philosophy of technology and her work on aesthetics. For instance, she drew an analogy between our affective reactions to humanoid robots (especially empathy) and those towards fictional characters in film, and made this approach the basis of her analysis and explanation of the "Uncanny Valley."

Since 2024, she has been an ordinary member of the Lower Saxony Academy of Sciences and Humanities in Göttingen.

== Selected publications ==
- Empathy with Inanimate Objects and the Uncanny Valley. In: Minds and Machines 19 (2009), 345-59. doi:10.1007/S11023-009-9158-2.
- Gibt es eine ästhetische Emotion? In: Kunst und Erfahrung, hg. von S. Deines, J. Liptow und M. Seel, Suhrkamp: Frankfurt 2013, 120–141.
- Begriffliche Reflexion in der Literatur. Eine Proxytypentheorie des kognitiven Gehalts der Literatur. In: Deutsche Zeitschrift für Philosophie 35 (2014), Sonderband: Wahrheit, Wissen und Erkenntnis in der Literatur, hg. von Ch. Demmerling und I. Vendrell Ferran, 219–242.
- Musil's Metaphilosophical View: Between Philosophical Naturalism and Philosophy as Literature. In: The Monist 97 (2014), 104–121. doi:10.5840/monist20149718
- Wahrnehmungsrepräsentation und Objektivität. Zur Verteidigung von Evans‘ Neo-Kantianismus. In: Sprache, Wahrnehmung und Selbst. Neue Perspektiven auf Gareth Evans‘ Philosophie, hg. von C. Misselhorn, U. Ramming und U. Pompe, Mentis: Paderborn 2016, 156–178.
- Arbeit, Technik und gutes Leben. In: Arbeit, Gerechtigkeit und Inklusion. Wege zu gleichberechtigter gesellschaftlicher Teilhabe, hg. von C. Misselhorn und H. Behrendt, Metzler: Stuttgart 2017, S. 19–38
- Artificial Morality. Concepts, Issues and Challenges. In: Society 55 (2018), 161–169. doi:10.1007/s12115-018-0229-y
- Maschinenethik und Artificial Morality: Können und sollen Maschinen moralisch handeln? In: Aus Politik und Zeitgeschichte 68 (2018), S. 29–33.
- Roboterethik. Erschienen in der Reihe Analysen und Argumente hg. von der Konrad-Adenauer Stiftung, Nr. 340 / Februar 2019.
- Is Empathy with Robots Morally Relevant? In: Emotional Machines: Perspectives in Affective Computing and Emotional Human-Machine Interaction, Springer: Wiesbaden 2019, hg. von C. Misselhorn und M. Klein (im Erscheinen).
- Grundfragen der Maschinenethik. Reclam: Stuttgart 2019 (5. Auflage).
- Künstliche Intelligenz und Empathie. Vom Leben mit Emotionserkennung, Sexrobotern & Co. Reclam: Stuttgart 2021.
- Künstliche Intelligenz – das Ende der Kunst? Reclam: Stuttgart 2023.
