= Transhuman Citizen =

2024 biography of Zoltan Istvan by Ben Murnane

Transhuman Citizen: Zoltan Istvan's Hunt for Immortality
- Author: Ben Murnane
- Language: English
- Subject: Biography; life-extension; futurism
- Publisher: Changemakers Books
- Publication date: 27 June 2024
- Publication place: United Kingdom
- Pages: 264
- ISBN: 978-1-80341-528-4

Transhuman Citizen: Zoltan Istvan's Hunt for Immortality is a biography of transhumanist and futurist Zoltan Istvan. Written by Ben Murnane, it was published by Changemakers Books in 2024. It won awards in the biography category of the NYC Big Book Awards and at the International Impact Book Awards.

== Synopsis ==
The 75,000-word biography follows the life and work of Zoltan Istvan. The narrative covers Istvan's childhood, his seven-year sailing trip, and his international journalism career at National Geographic. Following an incident with a land mine while on assignment, Istvan dedicated his life to promoting science as a means to overcome death.

The book details Istvan's formation of the Transhumanist Party and his runs for the US presidency and Governorship of California as a science candidate.

Additionally, the book's author Murnane, suffers from a life-limiting genetic condition, Fanconni anemeia, and this is explored in the book in contrast to the life of Istvan. In his teenage years he was saved from premature death by bone marrow transplants and the immunosuppressant drug fludarabine. Those early experiences sparked an interest in how technology can extend and improve human life which ultimately led him to transhumanism.

== Reception ==
The book was officially launched at the Marino School outside of Dublin, Ireland, on June 15, 2024, with both Istvan and Murnane giving speeches. Upon release it received mostly positive media coverage, including in Forbes, the Irish Independent, and Newsweek.

Chris Armstrong in the Marin Independent Journal wrote that the book is "a semi-political biography; it chronicles how transhumanism became an activist movement based on Mill Valley resident Zoltan Istvan's popular U.S. presidential and California gubernatorial runs from 2014 to 2020". Peter Clarke at Merion West wrote that the book offers "a taste of Istvan's vision, which may prove to be transformative for our culture".

=== Criticism ===
On the Transhumanist Party website, Dan Elton criticized the book's cover, stating that it makes Istvan appear "creepy". In The Malta Independent, writer Anthony Zarb Dimech discussed the biography critically in the context of the dangers of artificial intelligence. Dimech describes the book as a thoughtful exploration of the ideas of the transhumanist movement, but raises concerns that increased use of AI could lead to the erosion of cognitive skills and increased social isolation.
