= Immortality or Bust =

2021 documentary film by Barry Daniel Sollinger

- Theatrical release poster
- Directed by: Daniel Sollinger
- Produced by: David Kekich
- Starring: Zoltan Istvan
- Edited by: Quinn Maloy Williams
- Music by: A. Jeffrey Jacobson
- Release date: January 26, 2019 (Raw Science Film Festival)
- Running time: 87 minutes
- Country: United States
- Language: English

Immortality or Bust is a 2019 feature documentary focusing on the 2016 U.S. presidential campaign of Transhumanist Party nominee Zoltan Istvan. Directed by Daniel Sollinger, it won two awards at film festivals - the Breakout Award at the 2019 Raw Science Film Festival and Best Biohacking Awareness Documentary at the GeekFest Toronto 2021. It is distributed by Gravitas Ventures.

== Synopsis ==
Immortality or Bust explores the transhumanism movement and its major personalities as Zoltan Istvan drives his "Immortality Bus" across America.

The film begins with Istvan and his mother, Ilona Gyurko, mourning over the body of his father, Steven Gyurko. Months before his death, Istvan had been driving a 38-foot campaign bus shaped like a giant coffin in hopes of generating publicity for life extension science, which aims to overcome death with technologies such as genetic editing, robotic organs, and mind uploading.

Aboard the bus and featured in the documentary are embedded journalists from media such as The New York Times, The Verge, Vox, The Telegraph, and Der Spiegel.

The documentary explores biohacker gathering GrindFest, cryonics facility Alcor, Jacque Fresco's The Venus Project, and The Church of Perpetual Life, and virtual reality's Second Life via Terasem, among other places.

The documentary also features Istvan's visits with then Cyborg Party presidential candidate John McAfee, 2016 Libertarian presidential candidate Gary Johnson, and comedian Jimmy Dore. In the documentary Alex Jones and Fox News criticize Istvan's presidential campaign while Good Mythical Morning, underground group Anonymous offer support, and John Horgan at Scientific American offer support.

Immortality or Bust also focuses on Istvan's presidential campaign events, from California street demonstrations supporting transhumanism, to talks at Harvard University, to advocating for universal basic income, to delivering a Transhumanist Bill of Rights to the US Capitol. It also features Istvan's complex marriage to his wife and how his political ambitions affect his young children. The film concludes with Istvan's father voting for his son before he dies.

== Cast ==
- Zoltan Istvan
- John McAfee
- Gary Johnson
- Alex Jones
- Jimmy Dore
- Max More
- Jacque Fresco
- William Falloon
- John Horgan
- Erica Orange
- Rich Lee
- Alexis Madrigal
- Maitreya One

== Criticism ==
Film Threat reviewer Chris Salce says Istvan mentions Jurassic Park themes too much in his transhumanism ideas, and that works against the overall message of the film.
