= Daniel Sollinger =

American film producer (born 1967)

- Born: Daniel Sollinger; May 3, 1967 (age 59); Cumberland, Maryland, United States
- Education: New York University Tisch School of the Arts
- Occupations: Film producer, film director
- Years active: 1990–present
- Spouse: Frances Saunders (m. 2003)

Daniel Sollinger (born May 3, 1967) is an American film producer and director.

== Early life and education ==
Sollinger was born in Cumberland, Maryland. He started filmmaking while studying at the Fine Arts Center in Greenville, South Carolina.

Sollinger is a graduate of the New York University Tisch School of the Arts.

== Career ==
At the start of his career, he directed music videos for artists including EPMD, A Tribe Called Quest, Redman, DJ Jazzy Jeff & the Fresh Prince, and LL Cool J.

Sollinger produced the documentary Rhyme and Reason (1997), which was later ranked 35th on Rolling Stone's list of the 70 Greatest Music Documentaries of All Time.

He produced and directed the documentary Immortality or Bust (2019) which won the Breakout Award at the Raw Science Film Festival and Best Biohacking Awareness Documentary at GeekFest Toronto 2021.

He produced the drama film America's Family which won the Grand Jury and Audience Award at the 25th annual Dances with Films festival in Los Angeles.

Sollinger produced the KCET documentary series Artbound episode "Chinatown Punk Wars" (2023), which received a nomination at the Los Angeles Emmy Awards in the Entertainment Programming category and won the Feature Documentary over 25 Minutes award at the Los Angeles Press Club Awards.

== Filmography ==
=== Films ===
Year	Title	Role	Notes
1997	Rhyme and Reason	Producer	
1997	Six Ways to Sunday	Executive Producer	
1997	April V	Producer	
1999	Love Goggles	Producer	
2005	Age of Kali	Producer	
2005	God's Forgotten House	Producer	Award of Excellence, Feature Film category (2007)
2009	The Gods of Circumstance	Producer	
2009	Out of the Fog	Producer	
2010	The Putt Putt Syndrome	Co-Producer	
2012	California Winter	Producer	
2015	Dark Summer	Co-Producer	
2015	Ktown Cowboys	Producer	
2016	The Pastor	Co-Producer	
2019	Immortality or Bust	Producer and Director	
2021	Clean	Producer	
2022	America's Family	Producer	
2025	V13	Producer	

=== Television ===
Year	Title	Role	Notes
2005	The Nueva Estrella Awards	Producer	
2010	The Fuzz	First Assistant Director	Television film
2023	Artbound	Producer	Episode: "Chinatown Punk Wars"

== Awards and nominations ==
Year	Award	Category	Work	Result
2007	Award of Excellence	Feature Film	God's Forgotten House	Won
2014	Zed Film Festival	Outstanding Producer	L.A. Slasher	Won
2019	Raw Science Film Festival	Breakout Award	Immortality or Bust	Won
2021	GeekFest Toronto	Best Biohacking Awareness Documentary	Immortality or Bust	Won
2022	Dances With Films	Grand Jury Award for Features	America's Family	Won
2022	Dances With Films	Audience Award for Competition Features	America's Family	Won
2023	Los Angeles Emmy Awards	Entertainment Programming	Artbound – "Chinatown Punk Wars"	Nominated
2024	Los Angeles Press Club Awards	Feature Documentary over 25 minutes	Artbound – "Chinatown Punk Wars"	Won
