= Rhyme & Reason (film) =

- Theatrical release poster
- Directed by: Peter Spirer
- Produced by: Daniel Sollinger
- Edited by: Andy Robertson
- Distributed by: Miramax Films
- Release date: March 5, 1997 (United States)
- Running time: 94 minutes
- Country: United States
- Language: English

Rhyme & Reason is a 1997 documentary film about rap and hip hop. Documentary filmmaker Peter Spirer interviewed over 80 significant artists in rap and hip hop music. The film explores the history of hip hop culture, how rap evolved to become a major cultural voice (and a multi-billion dollar industry), and what the artists have to say about the music's often controversial images and reputation. Interview subjects range from veteran old-school rappers, such as Kurtis Blow, KRS-One and Chuck D, to rap icons Ice-T, Dr. Dre, and MC Eiht, to several current rap hitmakers, including Wu-Tang Clan, Tupac Shakur, and The Notorious B.I.G., less than four days before he was murdered.

The film was released to 280 theaters, earning $1,608,277 during its theatrical run.

On November 25, 2021, Rolling Stone published an article titled '70 Greatest Music Documentaries of All Time'; Rhyme & Reason was ranked 35th.

== Subject matter ==
The following artists were interviewed in the documentary:

- B-Real
- Biz Markie
- Busta Rhymes
- Chuck D
- Chuco
- Craig Mack
- Cypress Hill
- Da Brat
- Delinquent Habits
- DJ Muggs
- DJ Scratch
- Dr. Dre
- E-40
- Erick Sermon
- Fatlip
- Grandmaster Caz
- Guru
- Heavy D
- Keith Murray
- Kris Kross
- KRS-One
- Kurtis Blow
- Ice-T
- Jermaine Dupri
- Lauryn Hill
- Lords of the Underground
- Lost Boyz
- Lil' Cease
- L.V.
- Master P
- Mr. Animation
- Method Man
- Nas
- The Pharcyde
- Phife Dawg
- PMD
- Pras
- Tupac Shakur
- The Notorious B.I.G.
- Mack 10
- Q-Tip
- Raekwon
- Ras Kass
- Redman
- RZA
- Salt-n-Pepa
- Sean "Puffy" Combs
- Spice-1
- Spearhead
- Speech
- Tha Alkaholiks
- Too Short
- Tray Deee
- Treach
- Whodini
- Wu-Tang Clan
- Wyclef Jean
- Xzibit
- Young MC
- Yukmouth

== Soundtrack ==
Year	Album	Peak chart positions		Certifications
Year	Album	U.S.	U.S. R&B	Certifications
1997	Rhyme & Reason: Released: January 14, 1997; Label: Priority	16	1	US: Gold
