= Clean (2021 film) =

2021 American film by Paul Solet

- Theatrical release poster
- Directed by: Paul Solet
- Written by: Paul Solet; Adrien Brody
- Produced by: Daniel Sollinger; Paul Solet; Adrien Brody; Elliot Brody
- Starring: Adrien Brody
- Cinematography: Zoran Popovic
- Edited by: Arndt-Wulf Peemoller
- Music by: Adrien Brody
- Production company: Fable House
- Distributed by: IFC Films
- Release dates: June 19, 2021 (Tribeca); January 28, 2022 (United States)
- Running time: 94 minutes
- Country: United States
- Language: English
- Box office: $318,877

Clean is a 2021 American action thriller film directed by Paul Solet and starring Adrien Brody, who also produced and wrote the film.

== Plot ==
In Utica, New York, a truck driver nicknamed “Clean” works as a garbage collector in a decaying, crime-ridden urban residential neighborhood. He collects usable parts which he salvages, repairs, and sells to a pawn shop owned by his acquaintance. Clean lives alone in a workshop following the death of his daughter.

While picking up trash in the evening near a seafood restaurant, owned by a man named Michael, Clean notices Michael and his armed goons in the middle of a drug trafficking deal.

The next morning, Clean learns that his neighbor Dianda’s school bus no longer operates in her area due to service cuts, and offers to drive her to school. Later he refurbishes and drops off a bike for Dianda, at her house. Dianda’s grandmother, Ethel, questions his motives; he says that he is "just trying to save myself."

Upon realizing his suppliers have shorted him five bags of cocaine, Michael beats one of them to death, as a warning to the others. His son, Mikey, witnesses this in horror. That evening, Clean discovers the remains of Michael’s victim while out picking up garbage. Michael suddenly appears, apologizes for the stench, and offers him money, which Clean declines before continuing to do his job.

The next day, Clean’s car breaks down in a bad neighborhood. While he tries to fix it, a group of thugs chase a man past Clean into an alley. Clean follows them, and one of them knocks him out with a baseball bat. Clean wakes up in a hospital and is prescribed medication by a doctor, but he refuses before going straight home.

The next day, Clean sees Dianda with some thugs. He urges her go home, but Dianda replies that he is not her father. When the thugs get confrontational Dianda, to avoid further conflict, finally complies with Clean’s request.

At home, Michael angrily confronts Mikey for hanging out with his friends instead of helping him run his business. Mikey threatens him with a knife and decides to run away from home.

Clean works to clean up an abandoned house and later finds Dianda being bullied and on the verge of being raped by the thugs, among them Mikey, who are recording the encounter. Clean beats them with a pipe wrench and takes Dianda home.

The next morning, Michael is told that Mikey needs surgery or he may never speak properly again. To teach Mikey a lesson, Michael says there will be no surgery.

After watching the recording from the prior night, Michael orders Frank, a corrupt police officer, to kill Dianda and Ethel and bring Clean to him alive.

Clean attempts to leave the city with Dianda and Ethel, but notices that he’s being followed. While being pulled over, Clean recognizes the police officer as one who’s been bribed by Michael. Clean speeds off but his car starts breaking down, though he manages to evade the police. Stopping at a diner, Dianda escorts Ethel to the restroom while Clean searches for a vehicle to hijack. Michael’s henchmen arrive and chase Dianda and Ethel to the back rooms of the building. Clean intercepts them and kills each one.

After stopping at a motel for the night, Ethel blames Clean for endangering them and displacing them from their home. Clean vows to make things right and returns home to buy weapons.

At Michael’s residence, Frank learns that Clean was once a feared professional assassin known as “The Grim Reaper”. Clean calls Michael, warning him that he is coming for him.

Clean crashes the garbage truck into Michael’s home and gets into a shootout with Michael’s men, killing them effortlessly. He is then beaten by Michael, but manages to turn the fight around. He is about to kill Michael when an armed Mikey appears. Michael thinks his son will kill Clean, but Mikey empties the weapon into his father. He then attempts to shoot Clean, but is out of ammo.

Some time afterwards, crime rates in Dianda’s neighborhood have significantly waned as more kids come out to play in the streets. While pedaling down the street, Dianda notices a garbage truck approaching and smiles.

== Cast ==
- Adrien Brody as Clean
- Glenn Fleshler as Michael
- Richie Merritt as Mikey
- Chandler DuPont as Dianda
- Mykelti Williamson as Travis
- RZA as Pawn Shop Kurt
- Michelle Wilson as Ethel
- John Bianco as Frank
- Gerard Cordero as Vic
- Catherine Nastasi as Mikey's Mom
- Alex Corrado as Tommy
- Jade Yorker as Dante

== Production ==
Filming took place in Utica on 2018.

== Release ==
The film premiered at the Tribeca Film Festival on June 19, 2021.

On September 1, 2021, it was announced that IFC Films acquired North American distribution rights to the film. It was released in theaters on January 28, 2022. In April 2022, IFC Films signed an output deal with AMC+. The film was released on the streaming service on May 6, 2022.

== Reception ==
=== Box office ===
In the United States and Canada, the film earned $162,098 from 254 theaters in its opening weekend.

=== Critical response ===
On the review aggregator website Rotten Tomatoes, 46% of 37 critics' reviews are positive, with an average rating of 5.6/10.

Nick Schager of Variety gave the film a negative review and wrote, "Obvious and derivative in borderline-shameless fashion, it’s a B-movie knock-off with little originality and even less flair." Andrew Mack of Screen Anarchy gave the film a positive review and wrote that Brody and Solet "made a compact vision of the Man With a Past type thriller and given it more emotional heft than most of its predecessors combined".
