= Gennady Stolyarov II =

Belarusian-American writer

Chairman of the U.S. Transhumanist Party

Personal details
- Born: 27 July 1987 (age 39) Minsk, Byelorussian SSR, Soviet Union (present-day Belarus)
- Citizenship: United States
- Party: Transhumanist
- Education: Hillsdale College (BSc)
- Occupation: Writer; activist; actuary
- Website: The Rational Argumentator

YouTube information
- Channel: GStolyarovII
- Subscribers: 4.4 thousand
- Views: 725 thousand
- Last updated: April 13, 2025

Gennady Stolyarov II (Note: Belarusian: Генадзь Сталяроў II, romanized: Hyenadz’ Stalyarow II) (born c. 1987) is an American libertarian and transhumanist writer, actuary, and civil servant known for his book Death is Wrong. Stolyarov also lead the U.S. Transhumanist Party.

== Death is Wrong and other publications ==
In his 2013 children's book, Death is Wrong, Stolyarov argues that death is an enemy and encourages readers to help overcome it using technology. Stolyarov believes the first necessary step in accomplishing immortality (unlimited lifespans) is to believe that it is possible and dying is not required, and therefore teaching this idea to our children is important.

In their 2017 book Juvenescence: Investing in the Age of Longevity, entrepreneurs and investors Jim Mellon and Al Chalabi wrote, “Longevists such as Gennady Stolyarov have also been prominent in recent years. Stolyarov wrote that death is ‘the enemy of us all, to be fought with medicine, science, and technology’ – and adding our own postscript, only now are the armaments for that fight available to scientists.”

== Transhumanist politics ==
Stolyarov is also involved in transhumanist politics. He is the chairman of the United States Transhumanist Party, which advocates life extension, and which claims over 1,600 members by October 2019. Alex Pearlman published an extensive profile of the U.S. Transhumanist Party's 2019 Presidential Primary on Medium's GEN on October 16, 2019. While Pearlman described some of the chaos of this primary process, she also noted that "Since taking over, Stolyarov has organized the fringe ideology [of transhumanism] into an efficient political machine, registering it as an official political party in Nevada, and growing party membership to over 1,600 registered members." James Bickerton of the UK Express interviewed Stolyarov for a July 6, 2020, profile on the 2020 U.S. Transhumanist Party Presidential candidacy of Charlie Kam. Stolyarov is cited as stating that the electoral campaign's "focus was on raising awareness of the movement claiming: 'What I’ve found out with regard to transhumanism is that the barrier really isn’t hostility on the part of the general public, the greatest barrier is unawareness. So how does one spread awareness? One seeks to reach new demographics and one seeks to reach them using creative means.'" In April 2021, Riley Snyder and Tabitha Mueller of The Nevada Independent covered Stolyarov's opposition, on behalf of the U.S. Transhumanist Party, to Nevada's Senate Bill 292, a Democratic-Party-sponsored bill which increased the barriers to ballot access for minor political parties.

== Interviews ==
Frank Swain of BBC Future interviewed Stolyarov in April 2014 and described Stolyarov's view that death “is simply a technological challenge waiting for the appropriate level of money and manpower to solve it.” Stolyarov is cited as stating that “It would be wonderful to get to a world where all death is optional. Right now, essentially all of us are sentenced to the death penalty, even though most of us have done nothing to deserve it.”

In his last regular column for BBC Future on September 23, 2014, Frank Swain revisited his interview with Stolyarov and featured Stolyarov's views on the future of human augmentation: "Instead of relentlessly optimising ourselves to a model of perfection, he predicts an explosion of diversity. 'Different people would choose to augment themselves in different ways, stretching their abilities in different directions. We will not see a monolithic hierarchy of some augmented humans at the top, while the non-augmented humans get relegated to the bottom,' he reasons. 'Rather, widespread acceptance of emerging technologies would create a future where a thousand augmented flowers will bloom.'" Swain wrote, "I prefer Stolyarov’s vision of the future, and it’s one I subscribe to."

Molly Fosco of OZY Media interviewed Stolyarov for the March 25, 2019, Episode 4 of the Future of Health podcast, where Stolyarov's thoughts were cited regarding the future of radical life extension, the technologies involved in it, the philosophy of transhumanism, and how humans who apply various commonplace technologies can already be considered transhuman. In the podcast Stolyarov is quoted as stating that “Radical life extension will be a combination of nanotechnology, robotics, AI and repairing the body at the cellular level” and “Nothing is beyond the reach of human reason in terms of improving our state of life, including the radical extension of human life.” Stolyarov further expressed his thoughts about types of future enhancements: "I think the future is one of integration between biological and mechanical or electronic augmentations. The key is to preserve a certain continuity of bodily processes. Whatever part you get, it needs to integrate seamlessly into your existing organism."

WIRED Magazine featured Stolyarov's views on transhumanism in a profile by Laura Mackenzie on April 29, 2020, entitled "Eternal Frame". Mackenzie cites Stolyarov as explaining that "most of us are already using technology to overcome human limitations in some way" and that through the progress of technology "we can overcome 'more fundamental limitations' such as material scarcity, disease, and even death." Stolyarov is further quoted as saying that, as a result of emerging medical technologies, “there would be no upper limit to the human lifespan; no expiration date, so to speak… My hope is [that this will be achievable] in 20 to 30 years from now.”

== Reception ==
Leanne Butkovic of Fast Company notes that the response to Death is Wrong in transhumanist circles has been positive, adding "The language is just saccharine enough for children to dig into, but the portentous themes will strike deep, philosophical chords in adults. The overall message is positive: The way technology is headed, we should be able to continue discovering and doing the things we love indefinitely." Joelle Renstrom, writing for Future Tense, criticized the book by calling it "creepy" and saying, "Kids could grow up not just afraid of death, but also afraid of failing to fix it." However, in October 2014, Renstrom also acknowledged that "Transhumanism has gained traction as scientists and thinkers such as Ray Kurzweil, Aubrey de Grey, and Gennady Stolyarov have become increasingly well known." Meghan Neal of Motherboard also called the book "creepy" but noted, "Wacky as this still all sounds, he may have a point."

Rebecca Hiscott of Mashable notes that the “final message is a call to action: Dying is wrong, children, but through scientific progress you can make it right.” Mark Shrayber of Jezebel writes "I agree that death is a frightening concept, one that keeps me up many nights. [...] I want to agree with Stolyarov that the singularity is coming and that in less than thirty years we will have harnessed life-extension to a point where we can all at least live to be 100. But I don't know if this is a concept we should be selling to children, especially without looking at the complexity of what such advances could mean."
