= Raja Chatila =

Raja Chatila is a Professor of Robotics, AI and Ethics at ISIR-CNRS and Sorbonne Université (formerly Pierre and Marie Curie University), France.

He received the Ph.D. degree in control science on robot navigation from the University of Toulouse Paul Sabatier, Toulouse, France, in 1981. He was the Director of Research, French National Center of Scientific Research (CNRS), Paris, France. From 2000 to 2006, he led the Robotics and Artificial Intelligence Group, LAAS-CNRS, Toulouse, France, where he was the Director of LAAS-CNRS from 2007 to 2010. He is currently a Professor with Sorbonne Université, Paris, where he has been the Director of the Institute of Intelligent Systems and Robotics from 2014 to 2019.

He has led major projects in autonomous and interactive robotic. His contributions to SLAM, robot motion planning, action planning, control and cognitive architectures, machine learning, and human–robot interaction are published in over 150 papers.

He was named a Fellow of the Institute of Electrical and Electronics Engineers (IEEE) in 2013 for contributions to robot navigation and cognitive robotics and received an IEEE Pioneer Award the same year.

He is a member of the Association for Computing Machinery (ACM) and the Association for the Advancement of Artificial Intelligence (AAAI).

== Honors ==
- IEEE Fellow
- IEEE Pioneer Award in Robotics and Automation (2013)
- Honorary Doctor of Örebro University (Sweden)
