= People Unlimited =

New religious movement

People Unlimited, previously known as the Eternal Flame Foundation, People Forever and CBJ is a new religious movement that claims that human immortality is within reach. The movement was started in 1982 by Charles Paul Brown, who was joined by his wife Bernadeane "Bernie" Brown and business partner James Strole, who together formed a leadership triad. The three preached what they called "cellular awakening", which is achievable through will alone. In 1996 the group had incorporated as the for-profit People Unlimited Inc. They later split, and in October 2014 Charles Brown died at the age of 79. According to the organization's website, as of 2021 it was still led by Bernadeane Brown and Strole. Bernadeane Brown died of breast cancer in June 2024 and was cryopreserved by the Cryonics Institute.

The organization has denied being a cult.
