= Nikola Kesarovski =

Bulgarian science-fiction writer (1944–2007)

Nikola Kesarovski (Bulgarian: Никола Кесаровски) (c. 11 November 1944 – 29 August 2007) was a Bulgarian science-fiction writer.

His most famous book is The Fifth Law of Robotics, published in 1983, the title being a reference to Isaac Asimov's Three Laws of Robotics and the fifth law being that a robot must know that it is a robot.

The science- fiction fan club "Fantastica" was founded in 1997 in the town of Kardzhali, in the south of Bulgaria by him. The club has a page in Nov Jivot (New Life) - the official newspaper of Kardzhali - and up to late 2003, it had published over 60 issues. He also edited the magazine Kosmos.

He was also organizer and kind host of the annual Bulgarian science-fiction festival "The 2002 Bulgacon", which took place in Kardzhali. The festival was attended by over 900 participants.

Kesarovski committed suicide in 2007 by jumping from a seventh-storey window of a hospital in Kardzhali.
