= Zoltan Istvan =

American transhumanist writer and politician (born 1973)

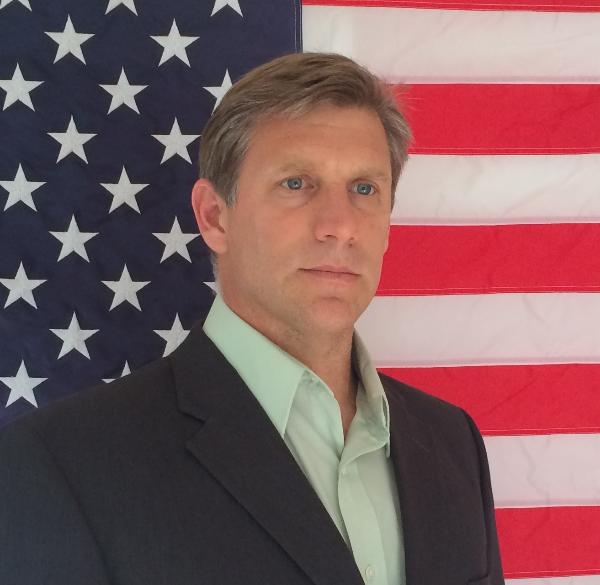
- Istvan in 2017
- Born: Zoltan Istvan Gyurko; March 30, 1973 (age 53); Los Angeles County, California, U.S.
- Education: Columbia University (BA); University of Oxford (MSt)
- Occupation: Transhumanist
- Political party: Democratic (2025–present)
- Other political affiliations: Transhumanist (before 2017); Libertarian (2017–2020); Republican (2019–2020); Independent (2020–2025)
- Movement: Transhumanist politics
- Spouse: Lisa Memmel
- Website: zoltanistvan.com

Zoltan Istvan Gyurko (born March 30, 1973) is an American transhumanist, former National Geographic journalist, and international speaker. Istvan is the author of The Transhumanist Wager, a philosophical science fiction novel.

Istvan ran for his Transhumanist Party in the 2016 United States presidential election to raise awareness for transhumanist politics issues but did not place his name on any state ballot. In 2017, Istvan ran for Governor of California in the 2018 election as a member of the Libertarian Party. In 2019, Istvan ran for the Republican Party's nomination in the 2020 United States presidential election against President Donald Trump. In April 2025, Istvan announced he was running for Governor of California as a Democrat in the 2026 state election.

== Early life and education ==
Zoltan Istvan was born in Los Angeles in 1973 to his Hungarian immigrant parents Ilona and Steven (István) Gyurko. He was a swimmer and water polo player in his youth. Istvan graduated from Columbia University with a degree in philosophy and religion.

Istvan graduated with a master's degree in practical ethics from the University of Oxford.

== Career ==
=== Early career ===
Istvan was an online and on-camera reporter for the National Geographic Channel. His writings have appeared in a blog of the San Francisco Chronicle, and Outside. His work has been covered in publications such as The Huffington Post. Istvan's coverage of the war in Kashmir was made into a documentary, Pawns of Paradise. Australia's The Age acquired non-exclusive Australian rights to the show.

According to Istvan, he invented and popularized volcano boarding.

Istvan was a director at the nonprofit wildlife organization WildAid. Istvan owns various investment properties. He also owns vineyard properties under the name Zoltan Istvan Vineyards in Mendoza, Argentina, Bordeaux, France, and Napa Valley. His 2023 Argentine Malbec wine won Best Bordeaux Style Blend at the Winemaker Challenger International Wine Competition.

=== Futurist career ===
After publishing The Transhumanist Wager, Istvan began actively promoting transhumanism and other futurist issues via speeches, media interviews, activism and his writings. Istvan has written for many publications including Gizmodo, Slate, and The New York Times.

Istvan gives talks on futurist and transhumanist topics, which include speeches at the World Bank, Congeso Futuro and World Economic Forum (Global Future Council), He appeared on the Joe Rogan Experience, in the 2016 documentary The Future of Work and Death, and on C-SPAN discussing politics.

=== 2016 presidential campaign ===
In October 2014, Istvan announced that he was "in the very early stages of preparing a campaign to try to run" for US President in 2016. He stated that his goals would be to support scientists in "overcoming human death and aging within 15–20 years" to encourage Americans to embrace "radical technology and science" and to set up safeguards against dangers including potential abuse of such technology.

In October and November 2014 interviews, Istvan explained that he aimed to unify the transhumanist community, which otherwise was splintered, and to establish a single voice. He said great changes in society could happen and that Transhumanism could provide ideas, safeguards and policies. He said the aim for a Transhumanist Party would be to get onto as many state ballots as possible.

Istvan helped to publicize his campaign in late 2015 by driving a bus shaped like a coffin—the Immortality Bus—across the United States. Istvan planned the bus tour to raise awareness of life extension. At the end of the Immortality Bus tour, Istvan delivered a "Transhumanist Bill of Rights" to the US Capitol. His 20-point platform includes a universal basic income, increased funding for space travel and taking money from the military and putting it into science and medicine.

=== 2018 California gubernatorial campaign ===
Running for the Libertarian Party, Istvan suggested basic income could be paid for without raising taxes through a "Federal Land Dividend". Under this program, the government would allocate monthly payments to households by leasing out federal land. In his editorial for Reason magazine, he argued that reparations for harm caused to marijuana users during the federal government's war on drugs may be appropriate. He suggested reparations could be paid as tax credits or through the sale of federal lands, so as not to put further burden associated with the drug war on taxpayers. Istvan got 15th overall in the 2018 California gubernatorial primaries with 14,462 votes.

=== 2020 presidential campaign ===
In December 2017, Istvan announced he was considering running for the Libertarian Party's Presidential nomination. Istvan announced a run for the Republican nomination on November 19. He campaigned around the country and received 0.07 percent overall in votes of the declared Republican candidates.

=== 2026 California gubernatorial campaign ===
In May 2025, Istvan announced he was running for California Governor as a Democrat. He campaigned on Basic Income, AI issues, and putting robots in people's homes. He did interviews on Dave Asprey's podcast and The Young Turks. He ended his campaign before the primaries because he wasn't competitive enough.

== Philosophy ==
Istvan states that in the 21st century, as modern man confronts the finitude of life, everyone faces a Transhumanist Wager, a concept that is explored in his science fiction novel of the same name. The Transhumanist Wager follows from a life philosophy Istvan calls Teleological Egocentric Functionalism (TEF). Istvan summarizes the Transhumanist Wager as follows:

TEF is predicated on logic, a simple wager that every human faces: If a reasoning human being loves and values life, they will want to live as long as possible—the desire to be immortal. Nevertheless, it's impossible to know if they're going to be immortal once they die. To do nothing doesn't help the odds of attaining immortality—since it seems evident that everyone will die someday and possibly cease to exist. To try to do something scientifically constructive towards ensuring immortality beforehand is the most logical conclusion.

Istvan has promoted AI Day, the idea of a robot AI president, and the concept of a Longevity Peace Prize at the XPRIZE Foundation in 2019, among other transhumanist concepts. Writing for The New York Times opinion section, Istvan argued conservatives should consider supporting artificial wombs to move the abortion debate forward.

== Personal life ==
Istvan resides in Mill Valley, California, with his wife, who is a physician, and his two daughters. He identifies as an atheist. Istvan has a chip implanted in his hand and consulted with the US Navy about the use of the implant in humans.

In February 2015, he helped launch BiZoHa, an atheist orphanage, in Mukhoya, Kasese district, western Uganda.

== See also ==
- Transhuman Citizen
