= Transhumanist Party =

American political party

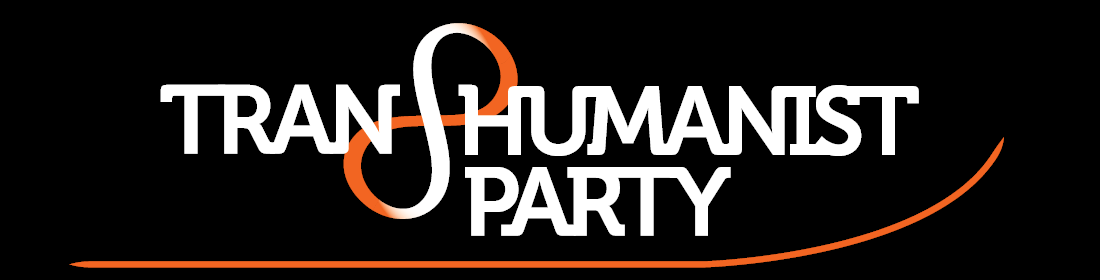
- Chairperson: Gennady Stolyarov II
- Founder: Zoltan Istvan
- Founded: October 7, 2014; 11 years ago
- Ideology: Transhumanism; Sentientism; Technogaianism; Techno-progressivism; Extropianism; Libertarianism
- Political position: Big tent
- National affiliation: All Hands for a Free Future
- International affiliation: Transhumanist Party Global
- Colors: Black Orange
- Slogan: "Putting Science, Medicine, & Technology at the Forefront of American Politics"
- Seats in the Senate: 0 / 100
- Seats in the House: 0 / 435
- Governorships: 0 / 50
- State Upper House Seats: 0 / 1,972
- State Lower House Seats: 0 / 5,411
- Territorial Governorships: 0 / 5
- Territorial Upper Chamber Seats: 0 / 97
- Territorial Lower Chamber Seats: 0 / 91

Website
- transhumanist-party.org

The Transhumanist Party is a political party in the United States. The party's platform is based on the ideas and principles of transhumanist politics, e.g., human enhancement, human rights, science, life extension, and technological progress.

== History ==
The Transhumanist Party was founded in 2014 by Zoltan Istvan. Istvan became the first political candidate to run for office under the banner of the Transhumanist Party when he announced his candidacy for President of the United States in the United States presidential election of 2016; he did not have ballot access in any state and received 95 write-in votes from two states. As part of his campaign Zoltan and a cadre of transhumanist activists and embedded journalists embarked on a four-month journey in the coffin-shaped Immortality Bus, which traveled on a winding cross-country route from San Francisco to Washington D.C. The Transhumanist Party has been featured or mentioned in many major media sites, including the National Review, Business Insider, Extreme Tech, Vice, Wired, The Telegraph, The Huffington Post, The Joe Rogan Experience, Heise Online, Gizmodo, and Reason. Political scientist Roland Benedikter said the formation of the Transhumanist Party in the USA was one of three reasons transhumanism entered into the mainstream in 2014, creating "a new level of public visibility and potential impact."

=== November 2016–2018 ===
Following the end of the 2016 presidential election, after Zoltan's 2016 presidential campaign was completed, Gennady Stolyarov II became the Chairman of the party, and the organization was restructured. Under Chairman Stolyarov, the party adopted a new Constitution, which included three immutable Core Ideals in Article I, Section I.

The U.S. Transhumanist Party held six Platform votes during January, February, March, May, June, and November 2017, on the basis of which 82 Platform planks were adopted. The U.S. Transhumanist Party holds votes of its members electronically and is the first political party in the United States to use ranked-preference voting method with instant runoffs in its internal ballots.

In May 2018 The New York Times reported the U.S. Transhumanist Party as having 880 members. On July 7, 2018, the U.S. Transhumanist Party reached 1,000 members and released a demographic analysis of its membership. This analysis showed that 704 members, or 70.4%, were eligible to vote in the United States, whereas 296 or 29.6% were allied members.

=== 2020 presidential campaign ===
The Transhumanist Party presidential primary attracted media attention from BioEdge and the Milwaukee Record. While some media outlets reported Zoltan Istvan was considering running again, ultimately he did not join the party's primary. After a protracted primary process with nine candidates, featuring numerous debates, Johannon Ben Zion was elected as the party's nominee. After winning the primary, Ben Zion gave his acceptance speech at RAAD Fest 2019 in Las Vegas. and filed with the FEC. Shortly thereafter, film producer, entrepreneur, and longevity organizer Charlie Kam became Ben Zion's running mate.

In October 2019 Ben Zion spoke to the DC Transhumanists meetup in Arlington, VA. In November he spoke at the Foresight Institute's Vision Weekend Event in San Francisco, and at Princeton University.

On March 4, 2020, Ben Zion participated in the Free & Equal Elections Foundation's Open Presidential debate in Chicago, Illinois. Zoltan Istvan also participated in the debate, running as a Republican.

On June 12, 2020, it was announced that Ben Zion had left the Transhumanist Party, with him declaring that his belief in Techno-progressivism was incompatible with the party and that he would instead be pursuing a run for the Reform Party nomination. Kam was declared the replacement presidential nominee. In June 2020 Charlie Kam participated in a panel with London Futurists and in July 2020 his campaign received press coverage in the Daily Express. On August 21, 2020, Kam announced his selection of Elizabeth (Liz) Parrish as his vice-presidential running mate. Kam did not have ballot access or registered write-in status in any state.

=== 2024 presidential campaign ===
The USTP's 2024 presidential candidate was Thomas Ernest Ross, Jr. Tom Ross won with 62.02% of the votes cast in the U.S. Transhumanist Party electronic primary held May 14–22, 2023. After winning, Ross selected Daniel Twedt to be his vice-presidential running mate. He did not have ballot access in any state.

Tom Ross's campaign had three major initiatives: the Earthling Initiative, the Artisanal Intelligence Initiative, and the Extraterrestrial Initiative. To demonstrate his commitment to AI governance, Ross appointed an AI campaign manager early in his campaign. Tom Ross appeared on podcasts, and his campaign was covered several media outlets like Decrypt.io, Scientific Inquirer, and New York City News.

== Platform ==
A core tenet of the USTP platform is that more funding is needed for research into human life extension research and research to reduce existential risk. More generally, the goal is to raise awareness among the general public about how technologies can enhance the human species. Democratic transhumanists and libertarian transhumanists tend to be in disagreement over the role of government in society, but both agree that laws should not encumber technological human progress.

The Transhumanist Party platform promotes national and global prosperity by sharing technologies and creating enterprises to lift people and nations out of poverty, war, and injustice. The Transhumanist Party also supports LGBT rights, drug legalization, and sex work legalization. The party seeks to fully subsidize university-level education while also working to "create a cultural mindset in America that embracing and producing radical technology and science is in the best interest of our nation and species."

In terms of foreign policy and national defense, the party wants to reduce the amount of money spent on foreign wars and use the money domestically. The party also advocates managing and preparing for existential risks, eliminating dangerous diseases, and proactively guarding against abuses of technology, such as nanotechnology, synthetic viruses, and artificial intelligence.

The USTP expressly supports the rights of Artificial General Intelligence entities that are sentient and/or lucid. The Transhumanist Bill of Rights Version 3.0 recognizes 7 levels of sentience and requires entities to exist at level 5 or higher to be considered as having rights. At level 5, the main criterion is that the entity be "lucid", meaning the entity is "meta-aware", or aware of its own awareness.

The various policy points of the US Transhumanist Party's platform have attracted both praise and criticism from sociologist Steve Fuller. For example, Fuller has praised the centrality of morphological freedom in the US Transhumanist Party's bill of rights, but on the other hand he has also written that the party is too critical of the US Department of Defense, which he argues could be an ally for some transhumanist initiatives such as human enhancement and existential risk reduction. In 2018 the party as a whole was reviewed favorably as an example of a successful "niche" party by Krisztian Szabados, a director at the Edmond J. Safra Center for Ethics at Harvard University.

== State parties ==
Affiliate parties exist in the states of Arizona, Colorado, Illinois, Kentucky, Maryland, Michigan, Nevada, New York, North Carolina, Pennsylvania, Texas, Virginia, Washington and the District of Columbia.

== International analogs ==
The Transhumanist Party in Europe is the umbrella organization that supports the national-level transhumanist parties in Europe by developing unified policies and goals for the continent. Among them is the UK Transhumanist Party, which was founded in January 2015. In October 2015, Amon Twyman, the party's leader at the time, published a blog post distancing the UK party from Zoltan Istvan's campaign.
