= Robot ethics =

Ethical problems related to robots

Robot ethics, sometimes known as "roboethics", concerns ethical problems that occur with robots, such as whether robots pose a threat to humans in the long or short run, whether some uses of robots are problematic (such as in healthcare or as "killer robots" in war), and how robots should be designed such that they act "ethically" (this last concern is also called machine ethics). Alternatively, roboethics refers specifically to the ethics of human behavior towards robots, as robots become increasingly advanced.

Robot ethics is a sub-field of the ethics of technology. It is closely related to legal and socio-economic concerns. Serious academic discussions about robot ethics started around 2000, and involve several disciplines, mainly robotics, computer science, artificial intelligence, philosophy, ethics, theology, biology, physiology, cognitive science, neurosciences, law, sociology, psychology, and industrial design.

== History and events ==
One of the first publications directly addressing and setting the foundation for robot ethics was "Runaround", a science fiction short story written by Isaac Asimov in 1942, which featured his well-known Three Laws of Robotics. These three laws were continuously altered by Asimov, and a fourth – or "zeroth" – law was eventually added to precede the first three, in the context of his science fiction works. The short term "roboethics" was most likely coined by Gianmarco Veruggio.

Roboethics was also highlighted in 2004 with the First International Symposium on Roboethics. In discussions with students and non-specialists, Gianmarco Veruggio and Fiorella Operto thought that a good debate could push people to take an active part in the education of public opinion, make them comprehend the positive uses of the new technology, and prevent its abuse. Anthropologist Daniela Cerqui identified three main ethical positions emerging from the two days of debate: those who see robotics as purely technical and disclaim ethical responsibility, those interested in short-term ethical questions (such as compliance with existing conventions), and those interested in long-term ethical questions (including the digital divide).

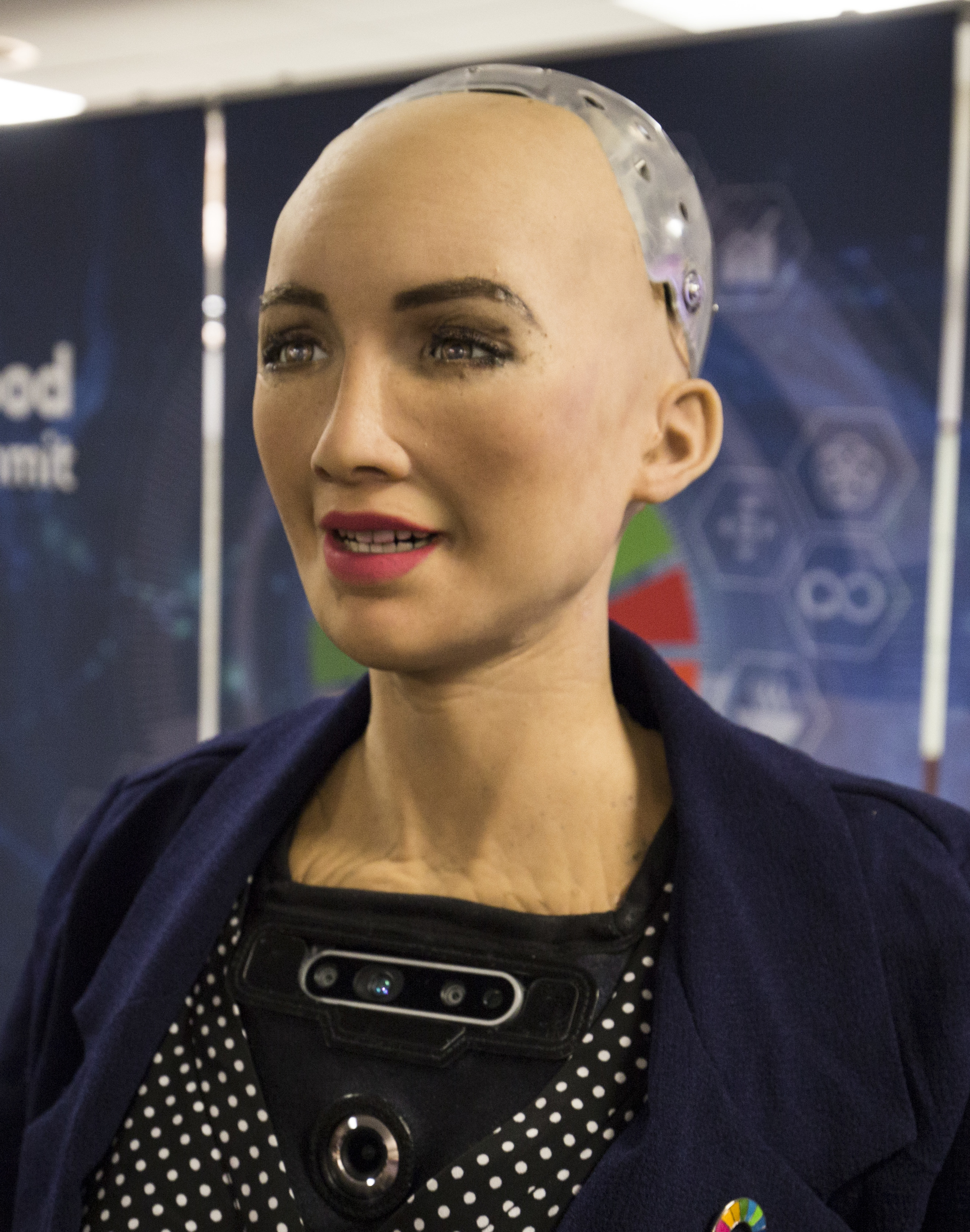
Sophia, a humanoid robot, obtained Saudi Arabian citizenship in 2017.

Some other important events include:

- 2004: the Fukuoka World Robot Declaration.
- 2017: in the Future Investment Summit in Riyadh, a robot named Sophia (and referred to with female pronouns) is granted Saudi Arabian citizenship, becoming the first robot ever to have a nationality. This attracts controversy due to legal ambiguity, for instance over whether Sophia can vote or marry, or whether a deliberate system shutdown is to be considered murder. Additionally, news outlets contrasted it with the limited rights that Saudi women have.
- 2017: The European Parliament passed a resolution addressed to the European Commission concerning Civil Law Rules on Robotics.

Computer scientist Virginia Dignum noted in a March 2018 issue of Ethics and Information Technology that the general societal attitude toward artificial intelligence (AI) has, in the modern era, shifted away from viewing AI as a tool and toward viewing it as an intelligent "team-mate". In the same article, she assessed that, with respect to AI, ethical thinkers have three goals, each of which she argues can be achieved in the modern era with careful thought and implementation. The three ethical goals are as follows:

- Ethics by Design (the technical/algorithmic integration of ethical reasoning capabilities as part of the behavior of artificial autonomous system, see machine ethics);
- Ethics in Design (the regulatory and engineering methods that support the analysis and evaluation of the ethical implications of AI systems as these integrate or replace traditional social structures); and
- Ethics for Design (the codes of conduct, standards and certification processes that ensure the integrity of developers and users as they research, design, construct, employ and manage artificial intelligent systems, see § Law below).

== In popular culture ==
Illustration of HAL 9000, a fictional artificial intelligence character from the film 2001: A Space Odyssey

Roboethics as a science or philosophical topic has been a common theme in science fiction literature and films. One film that could be argued to be ingrained in pop culture that depicts the dystopian future use of robotic AI is The Matrix, depicting a future where humans and conscious sentient AI struggle for control of planet Earth, resulting in the destruction of most of the human race. An animated film based on The Matrix, the Animatrix, focused heavily on the potential ethical issues and insecurities between humans and robots. The movie is broken into short stories. Animatrix's animated shorts are also named after Isaac Asimov's fictional stories.

Another facet of roboethics is specifically concerned with the treatment of robots by humans, and has been explored in numerous films and television shows. One such example is Star Trek: The Next Generation, which has a humanoid android, named Data, as one of its main characters. For the most part, he is trusted with mission-critical work, but his ability to fit in with the other living beings is often in question. More recently, the movie Ex Machina and the TV show Westworld have taken on these ethical questions quite directly by depicting hyper-realistic robots that humans treat as inconsequential commodities. The questions surrounding the treatment of engineered beings has also been key component of Blade Runner for over 50 years. Films like Her have even distilled the human relationship with robots even further by removing the physical aspect and focusing on emotions.

Although not a part of roboethics per se, the ethical behavior of robots themselves has also been a joining issue in roboethics in popular culture. The Terminator series focuses on robots run by a conscious AI program with no restraint on the termination of its enemies. This series has the same archetype as The Matrix series, where robots have taken control. Another famous pop culture case of AI with defective morality is HAL 9000 in the Space Odyssey series, where HAL (a computer with advanced AI capabilities who monitors and assists humans on a spacecraft) kills humans on board to ensure the success of the assigned mission after his own life is threatened.

== Killer robots ==
Lethal Autonomous Weapon Systems (LAWS), often called "killer robots", are theoretically able to target and fire without human supervision or interference. In 2014, the Convention on Conventional Weapons (CCW) held two meetings. The first was the Meeting of Experts on Lethal Autonomous Weapons Systems. This meeting was about the special mandate on LAWS and intrigued intense discussion. National delegations and many non-governmental organizations(NGOs) expressed their opinions on the matter.

Numerous NGOs and certain states such as Pakistan and Cuba are calling for a preventive prohibition of LAWS. They proposed opinions based on deontological and consequentialist reasoning. On the deontological side, certain philosophers such as Peter Asaro and Robert Sparrow, most NGOs, and the Vatican argue that granting too much rights to machine violates human dignity, and that people have the "right not to be killed by a machine". To support their standpoint, they repeatedly cite the Martens Clause.

At the end of the meeting, the most important consequentialist objection was that LAWS wouldn't be able to respect international humanitarian law (IHL), as believed by NGOs, many researchers, and several states (Pakistan, Austria, Egypt, Mexico).

According to the International Committee of the Red Cross (ICRC), "there is no doubt that the development and use of autonomous weapon systems in armed conflict is governed by international humanitarian law." States recognize this: those who participated in the first UN Expert Meeting in May 2014 recognized respect for IHL as an essential condition for the implementation of LAWS. With diverse predictions, certain states believe LAWS will be unable to meet this criterion, while others underline the difficulty of adjudicating at this stage without knowing the weapons' future capabilities (Japan, Australia). All insisted equally on the ex-ante verification of the systems' conformity to IHL before they are put into service, in virtue of article of the first additional protocol to the Geneva Conventions.

=== Degree of human control ===
Three classifications of the degree of human control of autonomous weapon systems were laid out by Bonnie Docherty in a 2012 Human Rights Watch report.

- human-in-the-loop: a human must instigate the action of the weapon (in other words not fully autonomous)
- human-on-the-loop: a human may abort an action
- human-out-of-the-loop: no human action is involved

== Sex robots ==
In 2015, the Campaign Against Sex Robots (CASR) was launched to draw attention to the sexual relationship of humans with machines. The campaign claims that sex robots are potentially harmful and will contribute to inequalities in society, and that an organized approach and ethical response against the development of sex robots is necessary.

In the article Should We Campaign Against Sex Robots?, published by the MIT Press, researchers pointed some flaws on this campaign and did not support a ban on sex robots completely. Firstly, they argued that the particular claims advanced by the CASR were "unpersuasive", partly because of a lack of clarity about the campaign's aims and partly because of substantive defects in the main ethical objections put forward by campaign's founders. Secondly, they argued that it would be very difficult to endorse a general campaign against sex robots unless one embraced a highly conservative attitude towards the ethics of sex. Drawing upon the example of the campaign to stop killer robots, they thought that there were no inherently bad properties of sex robots that give rise to similarly serious levels of concern, the harm caused by sex robots being speculative and indirect. Nonetheless, the article concedes that there are legitimate concerns that can be raised about the development of sex robots.

== Law ==
With contemporary technological issues emerging as society pushes on, one topic that requires thorough thought is robot ethics concerning the law. Academics have been debating the process of how a government could go about creating legislation with robot ethics and law.

A pair of scholars that have been asking these questions are Neil M. Richards Professor of Law at Washington University School of Law as well as, William D. Smart Associate Professor of Computer Science at McKelvey School of Engineering. In their paper "How Should the Law Think About Robots?" they make four main claims concerning robot ethics and law. The groundwork of their argument lies on the definition of robot as "non-biological autonomous agents that we think captures the essence of the regulatory and technological challenges that robots present, and which could usefully be the basis of regulation." Second, the pair explores the future advanced capacities of robots within around a decades time. Their third claim argues a relation between the legal issues robot ethics and law experiences with the legal experiences of cyber-law. Meaning that robot ethics laws can look towards cyber-law for guidance. The "lesson" learned from cyber-law being the importance of the metaphors we understand emerging issues in technology as. This is based on if we get the metaphor wrong for example, the legislation surrounding the emerging technological issue is most likely wrong. The fourth claim they argue against is a metaphor that the pair defines as "The Android Fallacy". They argue against the android fallacy which claims humans and non-biological entities are "just like people".

== Empirical research ==
There is mixed evidence as to whether people judge robot behavior similarly to humans or not. Some evidence indicates that people view bad behavior negatively and good behavior positively regardless of whether the agent of the behavior is a human or a robot; however, robots receive less credit for good behavior and more blame for bad behavior. Other evidence suggests that malevolent behavior by robots is seen as more morally wrong than benevolent behavior is seen as morally right; malevolent robot behavior is seen as more intentional than benevolent behavior. In general, people's moral judgments of both robots and humans are based on the same justifications and concepts but people have different moral expectations when judging humans and robots. Research has also found that when people try to interpret and understand how robots decide to behave in a particular way, they may see robots as using rules of thumb (advance the self, do what is right, advance others, do what is logical, and do what is normal).

== See also ==
- Ethics of artificial intelligence
- Plug & Pray – 2010 film by Jens Schanze
- Union of Concerned Scientists – U.S.-based nonprofit organization
