= Philip K. Dick Android =

Android by Hanson Robotics

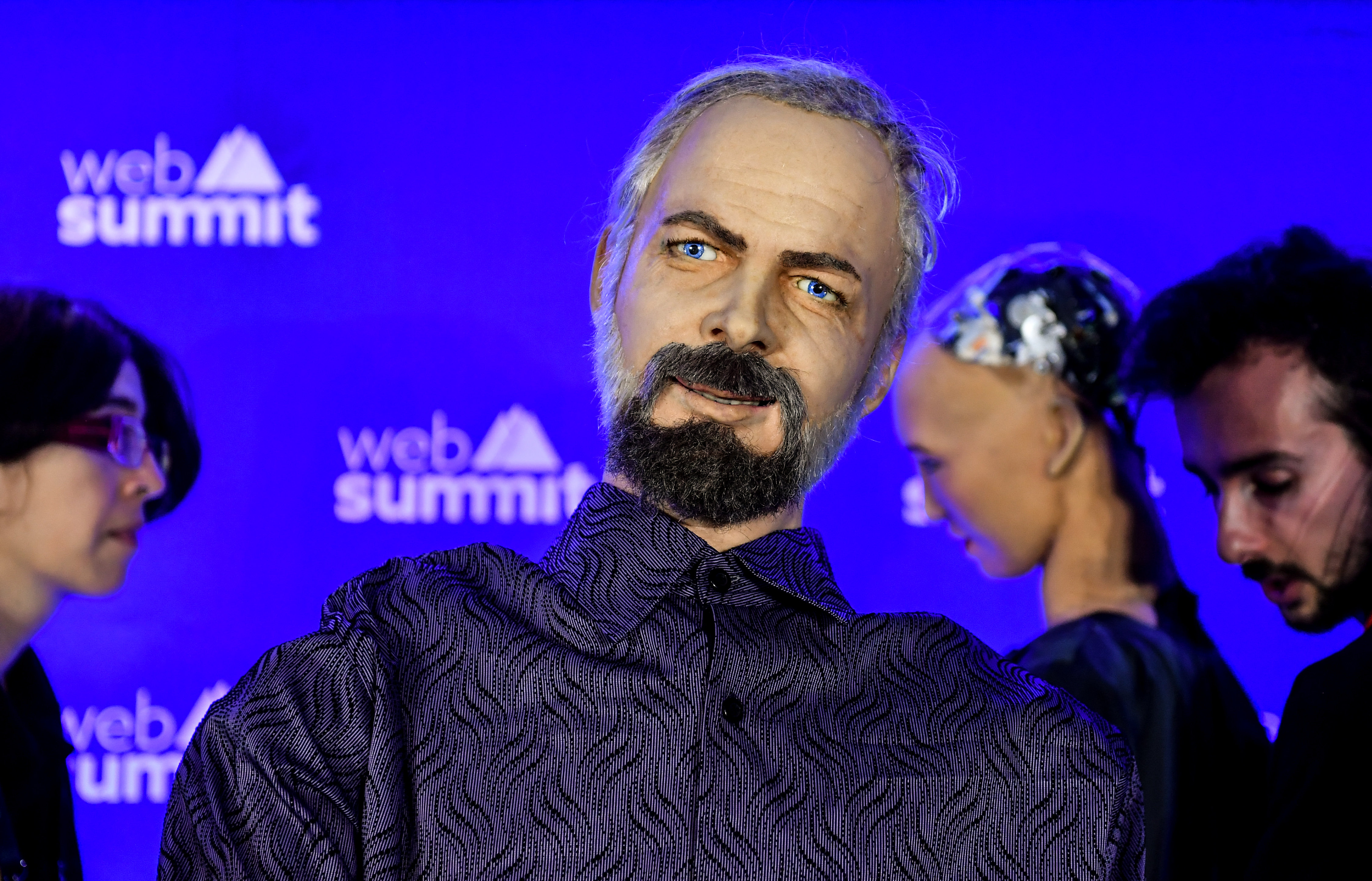
- Manufacturer: Hanson Robotics
- Inventor: David Hanson
- Year of creation: 2005
- Type: Humanoid
- Purpose: Technology demonstrator
- Website: hansonrobotics.com/philip-k-dick/

Philip K. Dick Android is a social humanoid robot and the android portrait of science fiction writer Philip K. Dick, created by technology company Hanson Robotics in 2005. It was first displayed publicly in 2005 at Wired NextFest. The system uses a standard conversational model trained on Dick's writings, and is programmed to respond to visitors' questions, similar to a chatbot.

In 2005, David Hanson and other collaborators on Philip K Dick Android received an AAAI award for an "intelligent conversational portrait" related to the project. An early version was lost during a flight from Dallas to San Francisco in 2005.

In 2011, Hanson Robotics collaborated with Dutch brodcaster VPRO to create a new version with 36 servomoters that can create a wide range of facial expressions. In 2015, Electric Literature reported that Philip K. Dick Android could make comments about robotic takeover of the world, similar to prospects in the author's novels.
