= Jon Kasbe =

Australian-Indian documentary filmmaker

- Education: University of North Carolina at Chapel Hill
- Occupations: Filmmaker, Director, Producer
- Years active: 2012–present

Jon Kasbe is an Australian-Indian documentary filmmaker. He is known for directing the films When Lambs Become Lions (2018), My Robot Sophia (2022), and the Hulu series The Deep End.

== Career ==
Kasbe’s debut feature documentary, When Lambs Become Lions (2018), follows an ivory dealer and a wildlife ranger in Kenya over three years. The film received support from the 2017 Sundance Documentary Fund, won the Best Editing Award at the 2018 Tribeca Film Festival, and was nominated for two 2019 IDA Awards in Best Cinematography and Best Editing. It was released theatrically by Oscilloscope Laboratories and later became available on streaming platforms including Netflix.

In 2018, Kasbe was included in DOC NYC's inaugural “40 Under 40” list of filmmakers. He co-directed, shot, and edited My Robot Sophia (2022), a documentary about inventor David Hanson and humanoid robot Sophia. The film premiered in competition at the 2022 Tribeca Film Festival.

Kasbe recently directed, executive produced, and filmed The Deep End (2022), a four-part documentary series released by Freeform and Hulu. The series profiles a spiritual teacher and her followers.

== Filmography ==
Year	Title	Contribution	Note
2012	Life Reflected	Director and editor	Documentary short
2012	A Beautiful Waste	Director and editor	Documentary short
2013	Heartbeats of Fiji	Director, writer and editor	Documentary short
2014	Mipso in Japan	Director, writer, editor and cinematographer	Documentary short
2014	The Hustler	Director, writer, editor and cinematographer	Documentary short
2014	The Last Barn Dance	Editor and cinematographer	Documentary short
2016	Nascent	Director, editor and cinematographer	Documentary short
2018	When Lambs Become Lions	Director, editor, cinematographer and producer	Documentary
2020	Blood Rider	Director, editor, cinematographer and producer	Documentary short
2022	My Robot Sophia	Director, editor, cinematographer and producer	Documentary
2022	The Deep End	Director, cinematographer and executive producer	Documentary series

== Awards and nominations ==
Year	Result	Award	Category	Work	Ref.
2016	Nominated	Santa Barbara International Film Festival	Best Documentary Short Film	Nascent	
2018	Won	Mountainfilm	Special Jury Award	When Lambs Become Lions	
2018	Won	Tribeca Festival	Best Editing in a Documentary Film	When Lambs Become Lions	
2018	Nominated	Tribeca Festival	Best Documentary Feature	When Lambs Become Lions	
2018	Nominated	Zurich Film Festival	Best International Documentary Film	When Lambs Become Lions	
2018	Nominated	Sheffield DocFest	Environmental Award	When Lambs Become Lions	
2018	Nominated	Denver Film Festival	Best Documentary	When Lambs Become Lions	
2018	Nominated	Camerimage	Feature Documentary Films Competition	When Lambs Become Lions	
2019	Won	DocuDays UA	Special Mention	When Lambs Become Lions	
2019	Nominated	International Documentary Association	Best Cinematography	When Lambs Become Lions	
2019	Nominated	International Documentary Association	Best Editing	When Lambs Become Lions	
2019	Nominated	Cleveland International Film Festival	Greg Gund Memorial Standing Up Award	When Lambs Become Lions	
2020	Nominated	Camerimage	Short Documentary Films Competition	Blood Rider	
2021	Won	Webby Awards	Video - Documentary	Blood Rider	
2022	Nominated	Camerimage	Feature Documentary Films Competition	My Robot Sophia	
2022	Nominated	Tribeca Festival	Best Documentary Feature	My Robot Sophia	
