= My Robot Sophia =

2022 American documentary film

- Official poster
- Directed by: Jon Kasbe; Crystal Moselle
- Produced by: Jon Kasbe; Crystal Moselle; Bits Sola; Tim Nash; Sally Campbell
- Cinematography: Jon Kasbe
- Edited by: Daniel Koehler; Enat Sidi; Jon Kasbe
- Music by: West Dylan Thordson
- Production companies: Kasbe Films; Give Thanks; Impact Partners; Somesuch
- Distributed by: Gravitas Ventures
- Release dates: June 10, 2022 (Tribeca); May 6, 2025
- Running time: 89 minutes
- Country: United States
- Language: English

My Robot Sophia is a 2022 American documentary film, directed and produced by Jon Kasbe and Crystal Moselle. It follows David Hanson and the creation of Sophia.

It had its world premiere at the Tribeca Festival on June 10, 2022, and is scheduled to be released on May 6, 2025, by Gravitas Ventures.

== Premise ==
Follows David Hanson and the creation of Sophia.

== Release ==
It had its world premiere at the Tribeca Festival on June 10, 2022. Initially set to be distributed by Showtime Documentary Films in September 2022, The film was subsequently acquired by Gravitas Ventures and set for a May 6, 2025, release.

== Reception ==
=== Critical reception ===
On the review aggregator website Rotten Tomatoes, 88% of 8 critics' reviews are positive, with an average rating of 5.50/10.
