= Satanic panic (Utah) =

Moral panic beginning in 1980s Utah

The Satanic panic in Utah is part of a broader moral panic that began in the 1980s as children in the United States, subjected to coercive interviewing techniques at the hands of zealous social workers, made unsubstantiated allegations of bizarre Satanic rituals and horrific sexual and physical abuse at the hands of day care workers. As the decade unfolded, clients of believing therapists began to make similar allegations, which are now generally seen as confabulations caused by iatrogenic therapeutic techniques such as hypnosis and automatic writing rather than the discovery of repressed memories. Despite the similarities between the allegations of adults and children, investigations produced only circumstantial, and in many cases contradictory evidence of the patients' disclosures. The court cases surrounding satanic ritual abuse (SRA) allegations (such as the iconic McMartin preschool trial) were among the most expensive and lengthy in history and produced no convictions or convictions based solely on the testimony of children that were frequently overturned or dismissed upon appeal.

The panic subsided in the late 1990s, but in the early 1990s while it was still a substantial concern, adherents in the Church of Jesus Christ of Latter-day Saints (LDS Church) began telling leaders of the church that they had been subjected to SRA by their relatives—often parents—and other members of the church.

== Lehi child sexual abuse scare ==
In the summer 1985 a resident of Lehi, Utah, Sheila Bowers took her children to see Barbara Snow, who divulged that they had been sexually abused by their babysitter, the teenage daughter of the local LDS Church bishop. Other parents who had their children babysat by the same sitter took their children to see Snow for therapy. These children also began to disclose sexual abuse by others, with eventually around forty adults were accused of being satanic ritual abusers of children. The Utah County Sheriff's Office and Utah Attorney General's Office began an extensive two-and-a-half-year investigation. The bishop's children were taken away by family services, but returned in several weeks after no evidence of harm was discovered. After the investigation, a Lehi resident named Alan Hadfield was the only one to be charged with abuse.

At the trial a Utah County chief deputy attorney testified that he observed Snow coaching children through a two-way mirror. "I was appalled", said the deputy attorney, "[Snow] had so conditioned those children that I had serious concern about using them as witnesses in cases." Snow countered that as a therapist, not a law enforcement investigator, she needed to create an environment where hesitant children who might have been threatened to be silent could feel comfortable disclosing abuse. Judy Pugh, a colleague of Snows at the Intermountain Sexual Abuse Treatment Center, told the court that she was concerned about how children's stories would homogeneously emerge after interviews with Snow. One ten-year-old girl testified that Snow asked her as many as fifty times in one session if Hadfield had touched her, and that she finally relented when she became afraid that Snow would yell at her otherwise.

Stephen Golding, director of clinical psychology at the University of Utah testified that Snow's techniques were "subtly coercive and highly questionable. There were several inconsistencies in the testimonies of the children. On April 6th, the children accused Hadfield of fondling them as they watched a television program, however telephone records showed that Hadfield was on the phone with Snow at the time the abuse was to have occurred. The children said their father had promised to buy them a toy four-wheeler for not revealing abuse, but receipts showed that the toy was purchased before the abuse was to have occurred. Hadfield was convicted by an eight member jury on December 19, 1987, and the judge sentenced Hadfield to 6 months in the Utah County Jail. The court placed an order that barred Gay Hadfield, the mother, from hiring Snow as their therapist.

In 1990, the Supreme Court of Utah granted Hadfield a review of his conviction on the grounds of "newly proffered evidence". The evidence concerned newly discovered similarities between Hadfield's case and other cases involving children interviewed by Snow, including multiple bizarre and highly specific details being repeated by the children involved in each case, which supported the claim that the children had been fed details by Snow.

== Government investigation ==
In 1991, the Utah State Legislature appropriated $250,000 for the Attorney General's office to investigate the SRA allegations in the state of Utah. Over a 2 1/2-year span, the investigators interviewed hundreds of alleged victims, but none of the incidents reported were corroborated with any evidence beyond their testimony, and the 1995 report stated that there was no evidence from any of the alleged victims that would warrant an investigation of homicide. Mike King, the coauthor of the report, told news media that the specific accusations against church leaders were "absurd", and Jerry Lazar, the head of psychiatry at LDS Hospital in Salt Lake City, said he "has never been able to independently verify memories of satanic ritual abuse".

== LDS Church reaction ==
=== The Pace memorandum ===
The Pace memorandum was a 1990 memorandum written by Glenn L. Pace, an LDS Church general authority, describing to a committee of the church the complaints of sixty members of the church that said they had been subjected to SRA by family members and other church members. The state of Utah conducted a 30-month investigation of the claims after the Pace memorandum was leaked to the press in 1991, concluding that there was no evidence found to substantiate the testimony of the alleged victims.

In July 1990, Pace, who at the time was a member of the church's presiding bishopric, fulfilled a request by the church's Strengthening Church Members Committee by writing a memorandum about his investigations into alleged incidents of SRA among Latter-day Saints in Utah, Idaho, California, Mexico, and elsewhere. The memorandum was leaked to the press in October 1991. In his memo, Pace stated that he had met with sixty victims who had recovered memories of ritualistic abuse during their childhood. Pace reported that children were being "instructed in satanic doctrine" and that as eight-year-olds they were "baptized by blood into the satanic order which is meant to cancel out their baptism into the Church". Forty-five of Pace's witnesses claimed to have witnessed or participated in human sacrifice, including the killing of babies. Pace said that the alleged perpetrators included "Young Women leaders, Young Men leaders, bishops, a patriarch, a stake president, temple workers, and members of the Tabernacle Choir" and that some of the abuse took place in church meetinghouses. Pace wrote that "when sixty witnesses testify to the same type of torture and murder, it becomes impossible for me, personally, not to believe them."

Pace compared these allegations to stories in LDS Church scriptures about secret combinations and Cain's combination with Satan to become Master Mahan. Pace also suggested that the alleged abusers were using and corrupting the oaths in the church's temple endowment ceremony as part of the Satanic abuse, and that many victims had flashbacks when they attended the temple for the first time and were asked to participate in the ceremonies. The LDS Church has made no official statement related to the allegations related in the Pace memorandum. In apostle Richard G. Scott's sermon in the April 1992 general conference, he warned Latter-day Saints against "detailed leading questions that probe your past may unwittingly trigger thoughts that are more imagination or fantasy than reality."

=== Allegations against LDS Church leaders ===
In 2018, at least six people sued the daughter of church president Russell M. Nelson for participation in SRA in the 1980s. While the church was not named a defendant, the suit claimed that victims approached apostle Neal A. Maxwell, who gave them a priesthood blessing and told them to "forgive and forget," and also insinuates that Nelson used his influence to cover up the abuse. The church released a response statement stating that the "allegations of interference or cover up are baseless and offensive."

== Martha Beck's allegations about Hugh Nibley ==
Martha Beck's 2005 book Leaving the Saints: How I Lost the Mormons and Found My Faith was controversial for accusations that she was sexually abused by her father, scholar, and LDS Church apologist Hugh Nibley, as well as stating she recovered memories of the abuse. She writes that she had forgotten the abuse until later in her life when, in 1990, she recovered them. The veracity of recovered memories is disputed, and the American Psychological Association says "there is a consensus among memory researchers and clinicians that most people who were sexually abused as children remember all or part of what happened to them," though there is also agreement among most leaders in the field, "that although it is a rare occurrence, a memory of early childhood abuse that has been forgotten can be remembered later." The allegations have been denied by Beck's mother and seven siblings. The book prompted widespread reaction, much of it within the Mormon community, and an email campaign against the book's inclusion on Oprah Winfrey's website as well as in her magazine.

== Teal Swan ==
During the early 2000s, Teal Swan claimed to have uncovered suppressed memories during therapy sessions with her therapist Barbara Snow. Snow had Swan file a police report with the local police department, calling the police on Swan's behalf. Police interviewed Swan with Snow in the room during which Swan disclosed recovered memories of abuse, physical abuse, sexual abuse, and a portal to another universe. The police began a preliminary criminal investigation. They performed a medical exam, but found no evidence of ritual abuse. After looking into Snow's background, the police did not feel it should be prosecuted because of Snow's involvement. According to journalist Jennings Brown, Snow's therapeutic methods played a significant influence in Swan's "Completion Process" methods.

== 2022 Utah County attorney race ==
In the Utah County attorney race between Jeff Gray and David Leavitt, allegations of ritual abuse became the forefront issue of the race. A woman had filed charges against Leavitt in 2012 that were dropped in 2014. The woman alleged that Leavitt was a participant in ritualistic sex abuse, killing and cannibalism. In June 2022, the Utah county sheriff's office reopened the investigation. Leavitt called for Mike Smith the Sheriff to resign, accusing Smith, who had endorsed Gray, of opening the investigation for political reasons. Smith has denied being politically motivated.

== See also ==
- Anne Johnson Davis
- False allegation of child sexual abuse
- Jay's Journal
