= Anne Johnson Davis =

American author and public speaker

- Died: July 29, 2010
- Occupations: Author and public speaker
- Known for: Publishing a memoir of childhood Satanic ritual abuse (SRA)

Anne Johnson Davis (died July 29, 2010) was an American author and public speaker who in 2008 published Hell Minus One, a memoir in which she claimed to have been a childhood victim of Satanic ritual abuse (SRA). In the book, Davis further claimed that her allegations of abuse were corroborated through a confession by her mother and stepfather made to Lt. Detective Matt Jacobson of the Utah Attorney General's office.

== History ==
In her memoir, Davis discusses her alleged abuse from the ages of 3 to 17, including sexual abuse, torture, and being forced to hurt her siblings in the context of satanic rituals, and her departure from her home at age 17. Davis made the allegations public in 1995 under the pseudonym Rachel Hopkins. At the time an investigation was underway by the Utah Attorney General's office into Satanic ritual abuse (SRA). According to Davis, her memories of abuse began surfacing in 1993. In 2008, Transcript Bulletin Publishing published Davis' memoir, Hell Minus One.

== Confessions ==
In 1995, under the name Rachel Hopkins, Davis states she was abused after a report was released by the Utah Attorney General's office that downplayed the existence of ritual abuse. As evidence, Davis provided a photo showing herself as a child with bruises, and also claimed her siblings corroborated her story. In addition, Davis provided a confession by her mother and stepfather regarding the abuse to detectives in the Attorney General's Office. Her parents also confessed to two investigators from the office, as well as to the leaders of the church they attended. In her book, Davis states that her parents were excommunicated by the LDS Church and sold their home to pay for her therapy.

== See also ==
- Pace memorandum
