= 2006 O'Hare International Airport UFO sighting =

Supposed paranormal event

The Chicago O'Hare UFO sighting occurred on November 7, 2006, when 12 United Airlines employees and a few witnesses outside O'Hare International Airport reported a sudden UFO sighting. The Federal Aviation Administration refused to investigate the matter because this unidentified flying object (UFO) was not seen on radar, instead calling it a "weather phenomenon".

== The sighting ==
At approximately 4:15 p.m. CST on November 7, 2006, federal authorities at Chicago O'Hare International Airport received a report indicating that a group of twelve airport employees were witnessing a metallic, saucer-shaped craft hovering over Gate C-17.

N912UA, the Boeing 737 involved operating as United flight 446, seen in 1999

The object was first spotted by a ramp employee who was pushing back United Airlines Flight 446 (N912UA; Boeing 737-500), which was departing Chicago for Charlotte, North Carolina. The employee apprised Flight 446's crew of the object above their aircraft. The object was also witnessed by pilots, airline management, and mechanics. No air traffic controllers saw the object, and it did not show up on radar.

Witnesses described the object as completely silent, 6 to 24 feet (1.8 to 7.3 m) in diameter, and dark gray in color. Several independent witnesses outside of the airport also saw the object. One described a disc-shaped craft hovering over the airport, stating that it was "obviously not clouds". According to this witness, the object ascended vertically at high velocity, leaving a clear blue hole in the cloud layer. The hole reportedly seemed to close itself shortly afterward. At least four of the eyewitness accounts of the sightings don't agree on the shape, height, movement, time, or even the number of objects sighted.

According to the Chicago Tribune's Jon Hilkevitch, "The disc was visible for approximately five minutes and was seen by close to a dozen United Airlines employees, ranging from pilots to supervisors, who heard chatter on the radio and raced out to view it".

== Reaction from the Federal Aviation Administration and United Airlines ==
Both United Airlines and the Federal Aviation Administration (FAA) initially denied that they had any information on the O'Hare UFO sighting until the newspaper Chicago Tribune, which was investigating the report, filed a Freedom of Information Act (FOIA) request. The FAA then ordered an internal review of air traffic communications tapes to comply with the Chicago Tribune FOIA request which subsequently uncovered a call by the United supervisor to an FAA manager in the airport tower concerning the UFO sighting.

The FAA theorized that the sighting was due to a "weather phenomenon" and would therefore not be investigating the incident. According to astronomer Mark Hammergren, weather conditions on the day of the sighting were right for a "hole-punch cloud", an unusual weather phenomenon.

UFO investigators have argued that the FAA's refusal to look into the incident contradicts the agency's mandate to investigate possible security breaches at American airports such as in this case; an object witnessed by numerous airport employees and officially reported by at least one of them, hovering in plain sight, over one of the busiest airports in the world. Some witnesses interviewed by the Chicago Tribune were apparently "upset" that federal officials declined to further investigate the matter.

== Media coverage ==
The Chicago O'Hare airport UFO story was picked up by various major mainstream media groups such as CNN, CBS, MSNBC, Fox News, the Chicago Tribune, and NPR.

On February 11, 2009, The History Channel aired an episode of the television show UFO Hunters with the title "Aliens at the Airport", in which they reviewed the incident.

The incident is also featured in the television series Hangar 1: The UFO Files episode "Unfriendly Skies".

This incident also is detailed in the series Ancient Aliens Season 19, Episode 9: "Aliens in Our Airspace".

== In popular culture ==
The film UFO refers to this incident, as does an episode of Boston Legal.

Gate C17 was released by Chicago area punk band, Tyre Fyre in September 2026.

== See also ==
- List of reported UFO sightings
- Manises UFO incident – another incident that included an alleged UFO sighting over an airport
