= Barbara Snow =

Barbara Snow may refer to:

- Barbara Snow (therapist), American therapist
- Barbara Snow (ornithologist) (1921–2007), English ornithologist and geologist
