= TTB =

TTB may refer to the following:

- Alcohol and Tobacco Tax and Trade Bureau
- Turkish Medical Association (Türk Tabipleri Birliği), the professional association and registered trade union for physicians in Turkey
- Ticking time bomb scenario
- Tooele Transcript-Bulletin
- Tortolì Airport
- Twin Traction Beam
- TMBThanachart Bank, a Thai bank
- Türk Ticaret Bankası, a defunct Turkish bank
- Telegraphic transfer buying rate, an exchange rate convention in Japan
- Top to bottom, a group of writing systems

Music

- The Trinity Band, an English soul quintet formed in 2004
- Trigger the Bloodshed, an English music group formed in 2006
- Tedeschi Trucks Band, a blues group from Florida

Television

- Time Traveling Bong a miniseries that aired on Comedy Central
