= Moshions =

Rwanda fashion house

- Product type: Apparel
- Current owner: Moses Twahirwa
- Country: Rwanda
- Introduced: 2015
- Website: moshions.rw

Moshions is a Rwandan clothing store, fashion house and brand that designs apparel and accessories. It was founded in 2015 in Kigali by Moses Turahirwa.

== History ==
Moshions was established in 2015 as a brand for menswear. The brand has since grown to more production segments including womenswear and accessories. The brand also outfitted Manneken Pis for Rwanda Liberation Day Ceremony and robot Sophia.

== Awards ==
- 2016: Made in Rwanda Emerging Enterprise of the Year Award
- 2018: Rwanda's Best Local Fashion House by RDB
- 2020: Emerging Made in Rwanda Entreprise of the Year
