= The Deep End (2022 TV series) =

2022 television documentary series

- Genre: Docu-series
- Directed by: Jon Kasbe
- Country of origin: United States
- Original language: English
- No. of episodes: 4

Production
- Executive producers: Tom Yellin; Gabrielle Tenenbaum
- Producer: Bits Sola
- Production company: The Documentary Group

Original release
- Network: Freeform
- Release: May 18 – June 8, 2022

The Deep End is an American four-part documentary series about the life and work of spiritual influencer and author Teal Swan. The docu-series was developed for Freeform by director Jon Kasbe, producer Bits Sola, and executive producers Tom Yellin and Gabrielle Tenenbaum. Jon Kasbe was present during three years and had access to almost every aspect of Teal Swan. The series was announced on April 5, 2022, and premiered on Wednesday, May 18, 2022, with episodes streaming the day after premiere on Hulu.

== Premise ==
Over the course of three years, filmmakers were granted full access to Swan and her cohort. The docu-series covers Swan's upbringing, her history of chronic physical, sexual, and emotional abuse, her rise to fame, and covers allegations of her being a cult leader. Freeform calls the series, “an arresting and provocative exploration inside the world of one of today's most controversial spiritual teachers and her dedicated followers.”

== Episodes ==
No.	Title	Original release date	U.S. viewers (millions)
1	"The Lost Toys"	May 18, 2022	0.064
2	"The Safe Place"	May 25, 2022	0.071
3	"The Carousel"	June 1, 2022	0.053
4	"The Adversary"	June 8, 2022	0.078
