= UFO (2018 film) =

2018 movie by Ryan Eslinger

- Directed by: Ryan Eslinger
- Written by: Ryan Eslinger
- Starring: Alex Sharp; Gillian Anderson; Ella Purnell; David Strathairn; Benjamin Beatty
- Cinematography: Ryan Samul
- Edited by: Brendan Walsh
- Music by: West Dylan Thordson
- Production company: Sony Pictures Worldwide Acquisitions
- Release date: September 4, 2018
- Running time: 88 minutes
- Country: United States
- Language: English

UFO is a 2018 American science fiction film written and directed by Ryan Eslinger, and starring Gillian Anderson and Alex Sharp. The story focuses on college student Derek Echevaro's attempts to prove the existence of extraterrestrials with assistance from his mathematics professor, Dr. Hendricks.

== Plot ==
Derek Echevaro, a gifted mathematics student at the University of Cincinnati is haunted by what he believes was a UFO he saw as a child. In 2017, a UFO briefly appears over Cincinnati International Airport and causes electromagnetic interference to the ATC broadcast. Cover stories dismissing it initially as a UAV and later a Gulfstream IV are released, but Derek does calculations that invalidate the airport's claims. He decrypts the ATC interference, ascertaining it is the fine-structure constant in 14 digit chunks.

Derek later finds an unexplained executable running on his computer, which prompts him to reformat the interference into binary code. His obsession begins straining his relationships with his friends and roommates Lee and Natalie. Derek’s efforts attract the attention of Franklin Ahls, a senior official with the clandestine FBI Committee on Aerial Phenomena. Ahls is in Ohio with a team of scientists overseeing the coverup and trying to decipher the message, and believes it is from at least an extraterrestrial Type 1 civilisation.

Believing he has a limited time to decipher the interference, Derek approaches his professor, Dr. Rebecca Hendricks, for help. Although initially apprehensive, she helps him investigate the cell phone signal disruptions that took place during the UFO incursion, but ultimately concedes there is a missing unit of measurement in the calculations. However, during a lecture on eigenvalues and eigenvectors, Hendricks deduces and tells Derek the missing unit of measurement to decipher the coordinates is 21 centimeters (the wavelength of neutral Hydrogen). Borrowing Lee’s car, Derek travels to the coordinates and briefly observes the UFO. It broadcasts a further signal, before disappearing again.

Derek is briefly detained by armed operatives, before being released into a car with Ahls, who confirms the UFO operators put the fine-structure constant in their message to help build a common mathematical language. Ahls tells Derek the new message is more complex and likely contains 3D coordinates to the extraterrestrials location. He confirms humanity is not alone in the universe, and offers to recruit Derek to assist in calculating a more refined version of the FSC to ensure the interstellar location they determine is accurate.

== Cast ==
- Alex Sharp as Derek Echevaro, a mathematics student at the University of Cincinnati
- Gillian Anderson as Dr. Rebecca Hendricks, a mathematics professor at the University of Cincinnati
- Ella Purnell as Natalie, Derek's friend and roommate
- David Strathairn as Franklin Ahls, a senior official with the FBI Committee on Aerial Phenomena
- Benjamin Beatty as Lee, Derek's friend and roommate
- Cece Abbey as Cecelia Abbey, a young girl censored by the FBI Committee on Aerial Phenomena
- Ken Early as Dave Ellison, a spokesperson for Cincinnati International Airport
- Brian Bowman as Roland Junger, the Administrator of Cincinnati International Airport

== Release ==
The film was released directly to video on September 4, 2018. Sony released a trailer on "UFO Day". The film has been described as delving "into math of universe navigation".

Nigel Watson of Starburst gave the film 5 out of 10 stars stating it was "all done in Spielberg's Close Encounters of the Third Kind, UFO promotes further study of the fine-structure constant to give us a leg-up in the hierarchy of civilisations and that’s as good as it gets".

== See also ==
- 2006 O'Hare International Airport UFO sighting
- List of American films of 2018
