= Manises UFO incident =

1979 flight incident in Spain

Coordinates: 39.4833°N 0.4500°W

The Manises UFO incident took place on 11 November 1979, during which an alleged unidentified flying object forced a commercial flight of the Spanish company Transportes Aéreos Españoles, with 109 passengers, to make an emergency landing at the Manises Airport in Valencia, Spain, when they were flying over Ibiza. After the emergency landing, a Spanish Air Force Dassault Mirage F1 took off from Los Llanos Air Base in order to intercept the mysterious object.

Journalist and author Javier Cavanilles has called it "the most famous UFO case in Spain".

== Incident details ==
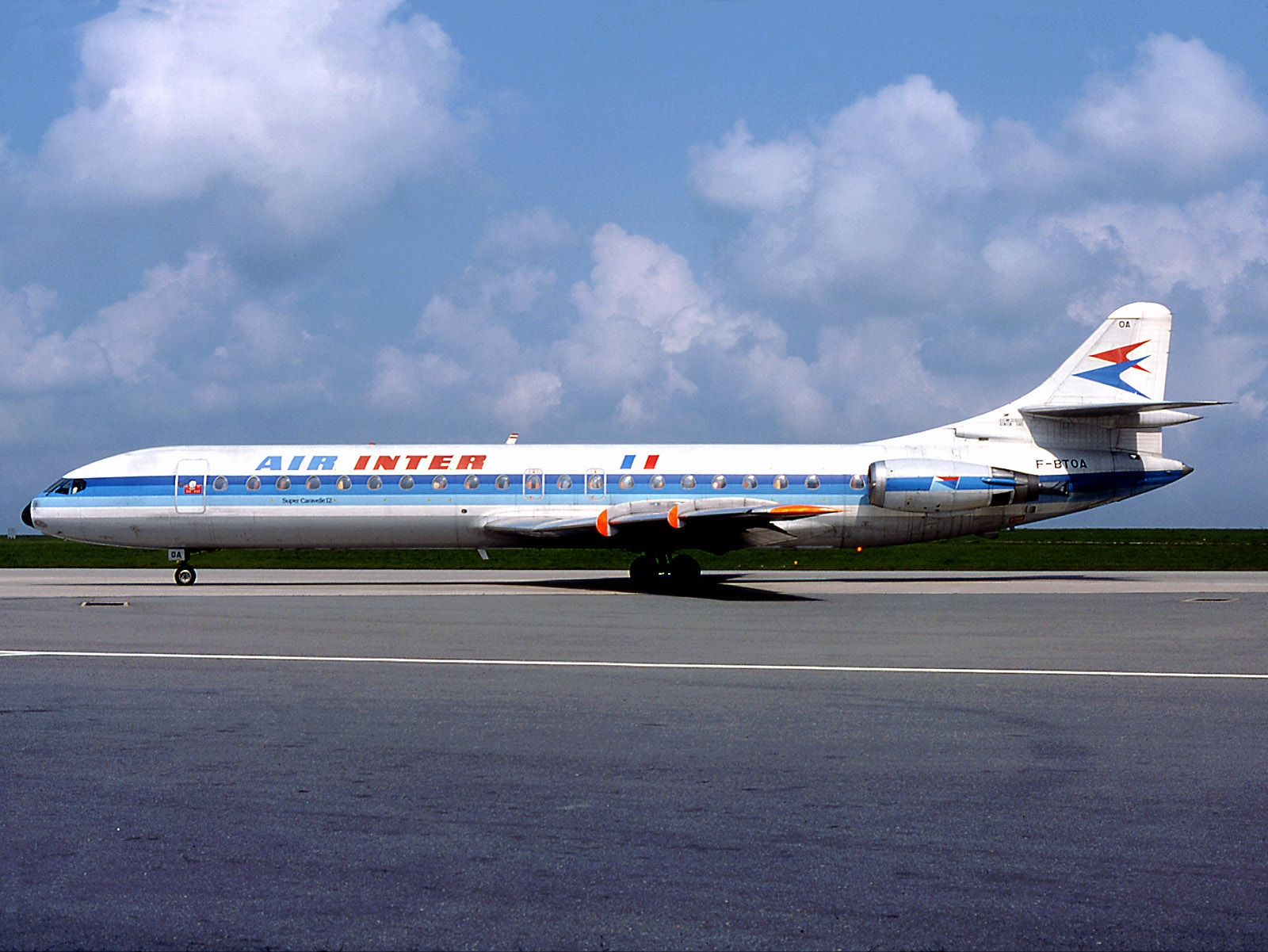
Pictured is a Super Caravelle SE-210 from the defunct French airline Air Inter. The photo was taken in 1980.

A TAE Supercaravelle was the first aircraft involved in the incident. Flight JK-297 had taken off from Salzburg (Austria) with 109 passengers on board, and had made a refuelling stop on the island Mallorca before setting course towards Las Palmas.

Halfway through the flight, at about 23:00, Captain Francisco Javier Lerdo de Tejada and his crew noticed a set of red lights that were fast approaching the aircraft. These lights appeared to be on a collision course with the plane, alarming the crew. He requested information about the inexplicable lights, but neither the military radar of Torrejón de Ardoz in Madrid nor the flight control center in Barcelona could provide any explanation for this phenomenon.

In order to avoid a possible collision, the captain changed altitude. However, the lights mirrored the new course and stayed about half a kilometer (0.31 mi) away from the plane. Since the object was violating safety rules and an evasive maneuver was deemed impossible by the crew, the captain decided to go off course and make an emergency landing at Manises Airport. This was the first time in history in which a commercial flight was forced to make an emergency landing because of a UFO.

The flight crew reported the lights abandoning the pursuit just before the landing took place. However, three new UFO signals were detected by the radar, each one with an estimated diameter of 200 metres (660 ft). The objects were seen by several witnesses. One of the UFOs passed very close to the airport runway, and emergency lights were lit in case the object happened to be an unregistered flight experiencing difficulties.

Given the lack of a response to all communication attempts, a Mirage F1 took off from the nearby airbase of Los Llanos in Albacete to identify the phenomenon. The pilot, Captain Fernando Cámara of the Spanish Air Force, had to increase his speed to Mach 1.4 just to be able to get visual contact with what he perceived to be a truncated cone shape displaying a bright changing color. Despite his initial efforts, the object quickly disappeared from sight. The pilot was informed of a new radar echo, which indicated that another object might be near Sagunto, Valencia.

When the pilot was close enough, the object accelerated and disappeared again; however, this time the UFO seemed to respond and the fighter had its avionics scrambled – its electronic flight systems were jammed and the on-board warning system in the F1 alerted Captain Cámara as though he were being locked-on by a continuous wave missile radar. After a third contact attempt, the UFO finally disappeared, heading for Africa. After an hour and a half of pursuit, low fuel forced the pilot to return to base.

== Possible explanations ==
By September 1980, the public impact of the incident was such that it had reached the Cortes Generales (the Spanish Parliament). The High Chamber representative Enrique Múgica Herzog publicly asked for an official explanation, but a UFO sighting was dismissed and the incident was attributed to a series of freak optical illusions.

The case file was prepared in 1994 by the Spanish Air Force and declassified in 1996. Several years later, agricultural engineer Juan Antonio Fernández Peris used the case file as a basis for a 200-page report that suggested Supercaravelle JK-297 pilot Francisco Javier Lerdo de Tejada, Manises Air Traffic Control, and the Air Force Captain Fernando Cámara might have been misled by "flashes emitted from a distant chemical industry complex" about 100 miles (160 km) away from Manises, as well as "some stars and planets". Although this possibility has been much debated and repeatedly rejected by the witnesses, it represents the official non-UFO-related explanation.

The in-flight difficulties experienced by the fighter were not mentioned in the public release. The electronic system failure on board the Mirage F1 could nevertheless be explained by the fact that the United States Sixth Fleet was stationed in the area, and was making use of powerful electronic warfare equipment while awaiting the outcome of the Iran hostage crisis. The F1 combat pilot, Fernando Cámara, rejected such a possibility, saying that the Sixth Fleet was too far and that his systems were jammed when he tried to lock onto the UFO with an IR missile.

== Bibliography ==
- Benítez, Juan José (1980). Incidente en Manises. Barcelona: Plaza y Janés. p. 302. ISBN 9788401331763.
- Cardeñosa Chao, Bruno (2010). El misterio Ovni: Un alto secreto al descubierto: investigaciones y evidencias. Ediciones Nowtilus S.L. p. 368. ISBN 9788497633420.
- Fernández Peris, Juan Antonio (2000). El expediente Manises. Santander: Fundación Anomalía. ISBN 84-607-0825-X.

== See also ==
- UFO sightings in Spain
- List of reported UFO sightings
