= Andrea Bonaceto =

Italian digital artist

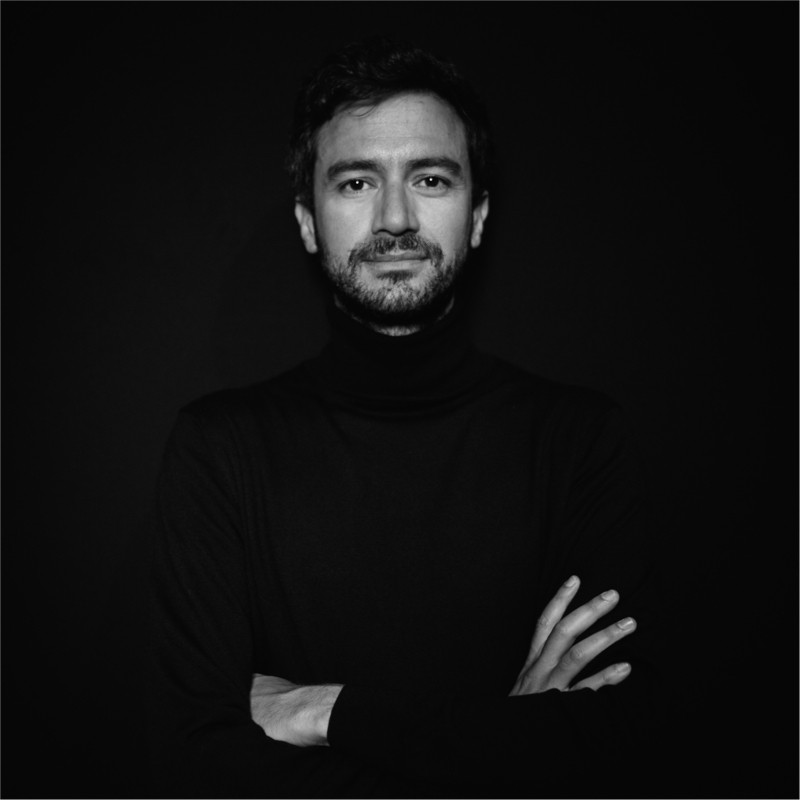
- Born: May 13, 1989; Pisa, Italy
- Occupation: Digital artist
- Known for: Contemporary art, digital art, Interactive art
- Notable work: ARTificial Intelligence, The Moon Landing, AB Infinite 1, Tempus Fugit, Fragments, Untitled
- Website: andreabonaceto.com

Andrea Bonaceto (born 13 May 1989 in Pisa, Italy) is an Italian digital artist.

== Selected works ==
=== ARTificial Intelligence ===
Bonaceto collaborated with artificial intelligence robot Sophia and created digital portraits of Sophia and her creators. The digital portraits were then processed by Sophia's neural network. Bonaceto then created a series of video loops documenting the evolution of the artworks from the human representation to the robot interpretation. The cornerstone piece of the release "Sophia Instantiation" that shows Bonaceto's portrait of Sophia evolving into her digital painting was auctioned on Nifty Gateway in March 2021 for $688,888.

=== The Moon Landing ===
Bonaceto was commissioned by Corriere della Sera to reinterpret the first page of the newspaper from 1969 announcing that “Man is on the moon”. The artwork is programmable and will transform to its final state once humans go back to the Moon. The artwork was auctioned in 10 unique editions on Nifty Gateway in September 2021 for a total of $100,700.

=== AB Infinite 1 ===
AB Infinite 1 is a digital interactive tapestry representing a collaboration between artist and viewer. By way of a specially designed AI mechanism, viewers of the work have been able to contribute to its appearance, using the hashtag #abinfinite1 on Instagram and Twitter. Images uploaded under the hashtag were translated with Bonaceto's AI technology, thereafter incorporated within the work's distinct visual vocabulary. Through the same process, any text posted under the hashtag became part of an evolving poem displayed within the work. AB Infinite 1 was auctioned at Christie's "20th/21st Century: London Evening Sale" in October 2022 for £151,200.

=== Tempus Fugit ===
Tempus Fugit is a digital artwork that revolves around the portrayal of an old clock belonging to Bonaceto's grandmother, said to have stopped at the moment of his grandfather's passing over three decades ago. The piece narrates a tale of life and death and possesses the ability to transform into a metaverse compatible 3D avatar. The artwork was auctioned during a standalone auction at Phillips in June 2023 for £127,000.

=== Fragments ===
Fragments is a series of twelve physical artworks created by Bonaceto in 2020. The first piece from the series, People, marked the artist’s public debut in the physical art market and was sold at Christie's during the Post-War and Contemporary Art Online auction on 15 October 2024 for £32,760, surpassing its estimate of £20,000–30,000.

=== Untitled ===
Untitled is a conceptual and participatory artwork developed by Bonaceto. The work explores the intersection of artificial intelligence and human self-awareness through site-specific digital installations and interactive AI interfaces.

Designed as an evolving digital organism, Untitled invites public engagement through AI-generated humanoid figures that collect and reinterpret personal stories. The project reflects Bonaceto’s ongoing research into identity, authorship, and the role of AI in shaping human expression. The work was presented across multiple venues in Hong Kong through 2025 and 2026.

== Exhibitions ==
- Untitled (public activation), Tsim Sha Tsui Centre, Empire Centre, and AIRSIDE, Hong Kong, from 9 January 2026
- Untitled, The Box (DX Design Hub), Hong Kong, 26–28 November 2025
- Fragments, Valuart Gallery, Lugano, CH
- Are You Physical or Digital?, Maison Bosi, Rome, IT
- At First Glance, Musée des Art Décoratifs, Louvre Palace, Paris, FR
- Crypto Art: A New Possibility, Central Academy of Fine Arts, Beijing, China
- Tempus Fugit, Phillips, London, UK
- Art In Space, Dubai, UAE
- AB Infinite 1, MEET Digital Culture Center, Milan, IT
- AB Infinite 1, W1 Curates, Flannels, London, UK
- Christie's 20th-21st Century Evening Sale exhibition, Christie's Headquarters, London, UK
- Decentral Art Pavilion, Palazzo Giustinian Lolin, Italy
- DART 2121 2nd Edition, Museo Della Permanente, Milan, Italy
- DART 2121 1st Edition, Museo Della Permanente, Milan, Italy
