= Caballo de Troya =

1984 novel by Juan Jose Benitez

Caballo de Troya (Spanish for Trojan Horse) is a book (the first of a series of twelve so far) written in 1984 by Spanish journalist, writer and ufologist Juan José Benítez López. It has reached considerable success in most Spanish-speaking countries as well as in Brazil. The first volume, Trojan Horse: Jerusalem, has been translated into English by LS Thomas; the copyright for this translation was submitted to the U.S. Copyright Office on May 31, 2012. It was also translated into Portuguese, French and Italian.

The plot of the book unveils the last period in the life of Jesus Christ as revealed through the first-hand experience of two pilots (or rather "timenauts"), members of a US Air Force top-secret military experimental project on time travel codenamed "Operation Trojan Horse", who in 1973 supposedly succeeded in travelling back in time to Judea in 30 A.D.

Jerusalen: Caballo de Troya 1 (Trojan Horse: Jerusalem 1), the original work by J.J. Benitez, was translated from Spanish to English by Margaret Sayers Peden.

In 2007 Jerusalen: Caballo de Troya 1 (Trojan Horse: Jerusalem 1) work was registered with the US Copyright Office. The English translation was scheduled to be released in 2013.

== Plot summary ==
The book is narrated as if it is a true account of how the author was approached by a retired US Air Force pilot, referred to as "The Major" throughout the book and as Jason in later books who, in an elaborate and indirect way tells the author how to find classified documents telling the story of Operation Trojan Horse, in which the Major witnessed the last weeks of Jesus's life by being sent back in time by the US military in an Israeli base in 1973.

A lengthy and detailed technical description of the time travel process ("inversion of quantum swivels") is provided. The time-traveller and the time-travelling vehicle are said to have been wrapped by an artificial skin to avoid biological contamination. The Major, who becomes the narrator of the story, is codenamed "Jason" during the mission, and has to learn fluent Aramaic and Greek as a necessary skill to interact with people of this era and place during the mission, as well as other extensive training.

It is "revealed" that many of the amazing stories of eclipses, earthquakes after Jesus's death and his transfiguration were linked to extraterrestrial influences. Jesus's physical appearance is described as tall, with "liquid honey" colored eyes and he is sometimes called "The Giant" in the novel due to his height being above the average Jewish man of that time.

== Background ==
Even though the 1970s UFO mania has lost traction in Spanish-speaking countries, Benítez has retained solid sales and a certain celebrity on the basis of his book series.

The following 8 sequels expand on the issue and reveal more details. Caballo de Troya 9, Caná was published in Spain in 2011.

He wrote in his website that he first became interested in the "real" life of Jesus around that time, when a team of researchers said that the Shroud of Turin showed traces of Jesus' body. These claims have later come under scrutiny, but the facts have not stopped the flow of new Caballo de Troya books. The author has stated that the time-travel part of Caballo de Troya is fiction, but that it contains "more truth than people think". The author insists that most, if not all, events in his books are real.

== List of volumes in "Caballo de Troya" series ==
- Caballo de Troya 1: Jerusalén (1984)
- Caballo de Troya 2: Masada (1986)
- Caballo de Troya 3: Saidan (1987)
- Caballo de Troya 4: Nazaret (1989)
- Caballo de Troya 5: Cesarea (1996)
- Caballo de Troya 6: Hermón (1999)
- Caballo de Troya 7: Nahum (2005)
- Caballo de Troya 8: Jordán (2006)
- Caballo de Troya 9: Caná (2011)
- El día del relampago (The day of the lightning) (2013)
- El diario de Eliseo - confesiones del segundo piloto (Elisha's diary - the second pilot's confessions) (2019)
- Caballo de Troya 12: Belén (2022)

== Influences ==
- There have been accusations of plagiarism for a previous novel of his called La Rebelión de Lucifer (Lucifer's insurrection). In that novel, the male main character (Sinuhé), who is a member of a secret society, learns and then teaches several revelations to the female protagonist. These revelations bear a lot of resemblance to those portrayed in The Urantia Book. Later on, these two characters participate in an adventure in which the material from The Urantia Book becomes merely the location where the action takes place. Therefore, the book itself is not plagiarized, but instead the material described in the revelations forms a foundation from which the plot of the book develops.

== See also ==
- UFO religion
- List of works by J. J. Benítez
