= Strengthening Church Members Committee =

Mormon organization monitoring publications

The Strengthening Church Members Committee is a committee of general authorities of the Church of Jesus Christ of Latter-day Saints (LDS Church) who monitor publications of antagonists, both external and of its members, for criticism of church leaders and teachings. If criticism is found, the committee may forward information to local church leaders, who may bring charges of apostasy, which can result in withdrawal of church membership.

== Creation ==
The committee was formed during the administration of church president Ezra Taft Benson, soon after he became president in 1985.

== Discovery ==
The existence of the committee became known in 1991, when a 1990 church memo from general authority Glenn L. Pace referencing the committee was published. The committee was one of the subjects discussed in the 1992 Sunstone Symposium in talks by Lavina Fielding Anderson and Eugene England (then a Brigham Young University (BYU) professor) on August 6, 1992. Soon thereafter, the Salt Lake Tribune published news stories on the subject (Tribune, August 8, 1992, and August 15, 1992). England came to regret his comments and apologized to all parties individually.

In response to this public discourse, the LDS Church spokesman, Don LeFevre, acknowledged the committee's existence. LeFevre said that the committee "receives complaints from church members about other members who have made statements that 'conceivably could do harm to the church'", then the committee will "pass the information along to the person's ecclesiastical leader." According to LeFevre, however, "the committee neither makes judgments nor imposes penalties." Discipline is "entirely up to the discretion of the local leaders."

== Church response ==
The existence of the committee became national news. Speaking to the New York Times, LeFevre stated that the committee "provides local church leadership with information designed to help them counsel with members who, however well-meaning, may hinder the progress of the church through public criticism.". He denied that such referrals were intended to intimidate scholars. The First Presidency then issued a statement on August 22, 1992, defending the committee based on an 1839 letter from Joseph Smith. The letter came while Smith was in prison after a period of intense persecution (see 1838 Mormon War), now canonized by the church (D&C 123), that directed church leaders to establish a committee for "gathering up a knowledge of all the facts, and sufferings and abuses put on" church members, and the "names of all persons that have had a hand in their oppressions". The statement indicated that the members were then James E. Faust and Russell M. Nelson of the Quorum of the Twelve Apostles.

In 1993, apostle Dallin H. Oaks characterized the committee as a "clipping service" that "may have monitored speeches, writings and activities of those suspected of apostasy and passed on material to church officials".

== Activities ==
According to Eugene England, BYU academic vice-president Stan Albrecht resigned in 1992 partly due to "difficulty carrying out university business because of complaints from BYU religion faculty about other faculty members' writings, made to the Strengthening Church Members Committee". England had known others affected by the committee's activities, some seeing their files, which in one case contained newspaper clippings about being a Young Democrat in college.

The committee is understood to still be in operation, and was mentioned during the 2004 church discipline of Grant H. Palmer in which it reportedly sent a dossier on Palmer to his stake president.

In June 2014, KUTV, the CBS affiliate for Salt Lake City, investigated whether the committee was involved when several LDS bloggers and activists were summoned for church discipline. John Dehlin's former stake president had news clippings and a lengthy podcast transcription, which Dehlin believed had been provided by another source, though he did not see a file on himself from the committee. Rock Waterman reported that his bishop became involved at the direction of an area authority. The church declined to comment, though an earlier press release had stated, "Decisions are made by local leaders and not directed or coordinated by Church headquarters." Several blogs also suggested the committee's involvement. The New York Times described this as a "crackdown" involving "more than a dozen Mormons", but quoted Michael Otterson of church public affairs saying, "There is no coordinated effort to tell local leaders to keep their members from blogging or discussing their questions online."

== See also ==
- Congregation for the Doctrine of the Faith, a Catholic organization which serves a similar role
- September Six
