= Nascent (film) =

2016 Central African short film

- Directed by: Lindsay Branham; Jon Kasbe
- Written by: Lindsay Branham
- Produced by: Lindsay Branham
- Cinematography: Jon Kasbe
- Edited by: Jon Kasbe
- Music by: Defacto
- Release date: 9 October 2016; (USA)
- Running time: 6 minutes
- Countries: Central African Republic; United States
- Languages: Afrikaans; English

Nascent, is a 2016 Central African documentary short film co-directed by Lindsay Branham and Jon Kasbe and produced by Lindsay Branham. The film based on the civil war in Central African Republic where two children, one Christian and one Muslim, comes together and find answers to the once divided peaceful nation along religious lines.

The film made its premier in October 2016 in the United States. The film received positive reviews from critics and made many official selections at film festivals such as, Santa Barbara International Film Festival, 2016, Big Sky Film Festival, 2016 and Women Deliver 4th Global Conference, Copenhagen, 2016. In 2016 at the Mountainfilm Festival, the film won the Best Cinematography Award.
