= List of works by J. J. Benítez =

J. J. Benítez bibliography
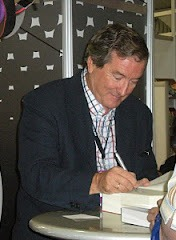
- Books↙: 29
- Novels↙: 11
- Collections↙: 6

The works of J. J. Benítez encompass literature and journalism, as well as UFO investigations. Primarily renowned as an investigator of the paranormal, Benítez garnered attention and criticism when he released Jerusalén, the first volume of a series named Caballo de Troya, related to the life and death of Jesus Christ. He began his journalist career in January 1966 in the newspaper La Verdad, after receiving a journalism degree from the University of Navarra in 1965. He published his first books in 1975, Ovni: S.O.S a la Humanidad and Existió Otra Humanidad.

During his three decades as an author, he has published more than 50 books, including investigative reports, essays, novels and poetry, and sold more than nine million copies worldwide. As of May 2007, 7 million copies has been sold from the first 8 books of the Caballo de Troya series. He has also directed a TV documentary series called Planeta Encantado, in which he travels to 17 different countries in order to render his interpretation of some of the great unsolved mysteries of past history.

== Books ==
UFO related

- El Hombre que susurraba a los «Ummitas» (2007)
- A 33.000 Pies (1997)
- Ricky B (1997)
- Materia Reservada (1993)
- La Quinta Columna (1990)
- La Punta del Iceberg (1989)
- Los Tripulantes No Identificados (1983)
- Los Espías del Cosmos (1983)
- El Ovni de Belén (1983)
- La Gran Oleada (1982)
- Terror en la Luna (1982)
- Los Visitantes (1982)
- Encuentro en Montaña Roja (1981)
- Incidente en Manises (1980)
- El Enviado (1979)
- Tempestad en Bonanza (1979)
- Cien mil kilómetros tras los ovnis (1978)
- Ovni: S.O.S a la Humanidad (1975)

Other books

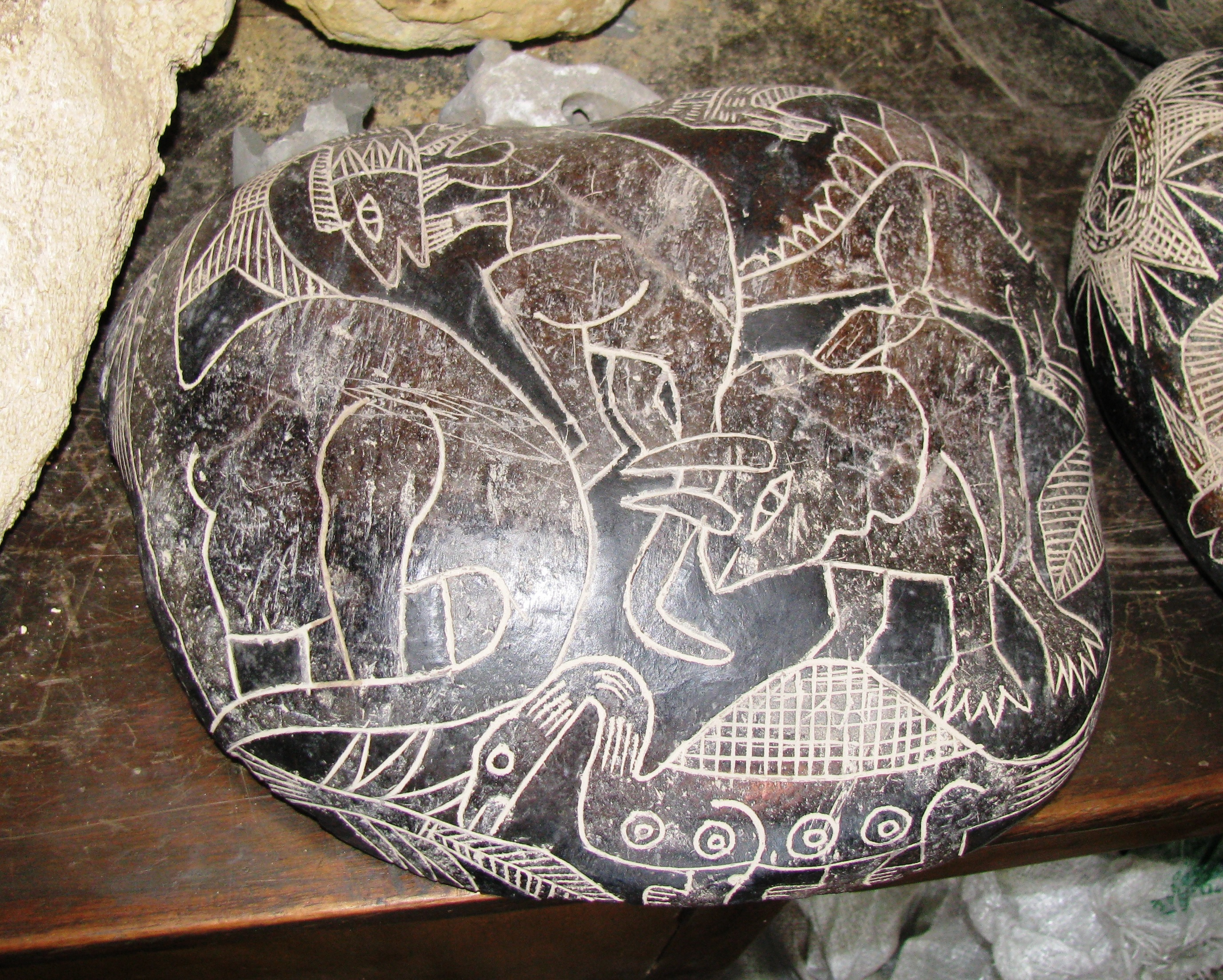
Existió Otra Humanidad is an investigation on the stones (pictured) on Ica, Peru, depicting an ancient civilization.

- De la mano con Frasquito (2008)
- Cartas a un idiota (2004)
- Mi Dios Favorito (2002)
- Al Fin Libre (2000)
- Mágica Fe (1994)
- A solas con La Mar (1990)
- El Misterio de la Virgen de Guadalupe (1989)
- El Testamento de San Juan (1989)
- Yo, Julio Verne (1988)
- La Otra Orilla (1986)
- Sueños (1982)
- Los Astronautas de Yavé (1980)
- Existió Otra Humanidad (1975)

== Novels ==
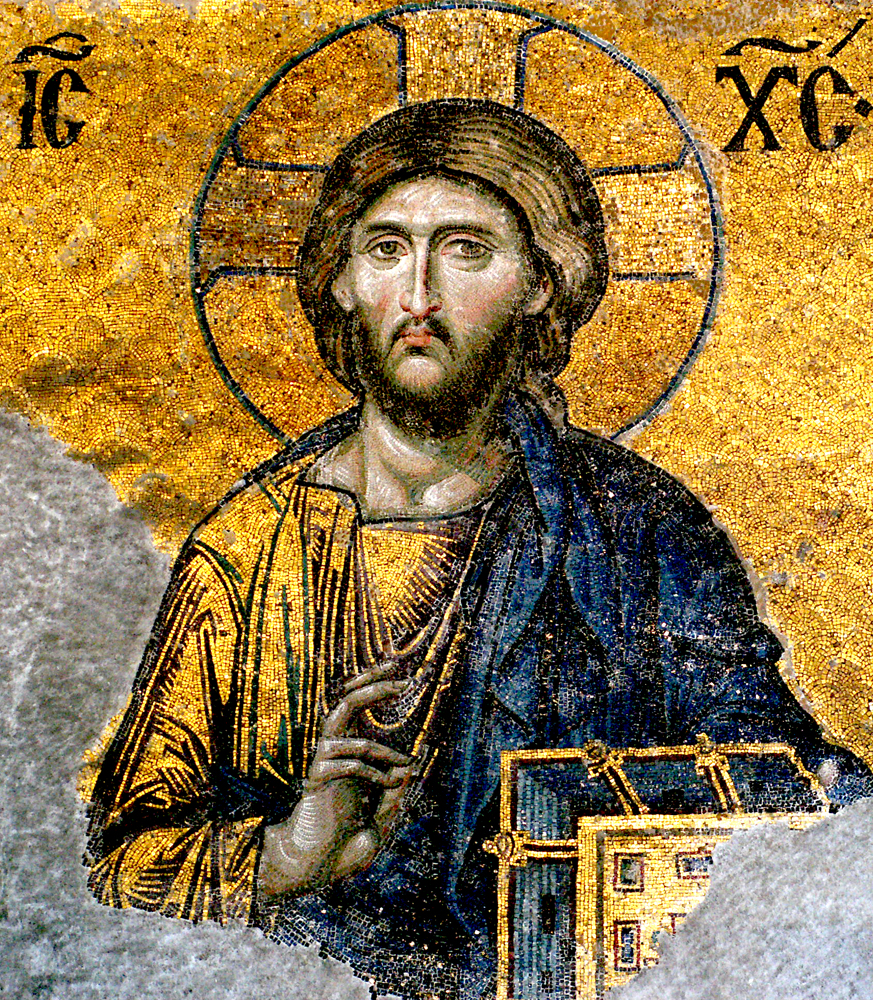
The main focus of Caballo de Troya is the life and facts of Jesus, shown "very different of what has been told".

- Caballo de Troya series:
1. Jerusalen (1984)
2. Masada (1986)
3. Saidán (1987)
4. Nazaret (1989)
5. Cesarea (1996)
6. Hermón (1999)
7. Nahum (2005)
8. Jordán (2006)
9. Caná (2011)
- La Rebelión de Lucifer (1985)
- El Papa Rojo (La Gloria del Olivo) (1992)

== Collections ==
- Mis Ovnis Favoritos (2001)
- Mis Enigmas Favoritos (1993)
- Siete Narraciones Extraordinarias (1989)
- Ovni: Alto secreto (1977)

== Documentary ==
Planeta Encantado series

1. La huella de los dioses. La isla del fin del mundo (2003)
2. Los señores del agua. El mensaje enterrado (2004)
3. El secreto de Colón. Un as en la manga de Dios (2004)
4. El anillo de plata. Tassili (2004)
5. Astronautas en la edad de piedra. Escribamos de nuevo la historia (2004)
6. Una caja de madera y oro. Las esferas de nadie (2004)
