= Frubber =

Frubber (from "flesh rubber") is a patented elastic form of rubber used in robotics. The spongy elastomer has been used by Hanson Robotics for the face of its android robots, including Einstein 3 and Sophia.
