= Barbara Snow (therapist) =

American psychotherapist

Barbara W. Snow is a practicing therapist based out of Salt Lake City, Utah. She was a central figure in the Satanic ritual abuse moral panic in Utah in the late 1980s and early 1990s.

== Academic career ==
In the 1980s, Snow was a member of the Association of Mormon Counselors and Psychotherapists (AMCAP) and published research centered on the issue of sexual abuse.

In collaboration with Teena Sorenson, she developed a framework that identified four stages children go through when disclosing sexual abuse. According to the study, the first stage, denial, occurs when a child claims the abuse did not happen. Disclosure is subdivided into two phases, tentative and active, which occurs when a child acknowledges the occurrence of abuse. Recant is a retraction of a prior disclosure. The final stage, reaffirm, is the final reassertion that the abuse happened.

Also in collaboration with Sorenson, in 1990 Snow authored a major academic article that helped fuel the Satanic panic titled "Ritualistic Child Abuse in a Neighborhood Setting." The study supported the notion that secretive ritualistic abuse was widespread but difficult to detect. The abstract states, "The majority of children showed little symptomology at initial referral with significant increases during the disclosure process. ... This study suggests that ritual abuse in neighborhood settings appears secretive, coercive and complex." The study attributes the difficulty in detection in part to disassociation and repression of memories by victims.

== Therapeutic career ==
In the 1980s, Snow worked as the clinical director of the Intermountain Sexual Abuse Treatment Center in Salt Lake City.

Snow was involved in a string of prosecutions in Utah during the 1980s. She led the investigation that in December 1986 convicted Arden Bullock of sexually abusing his children. The case was appealed to the Utah State Supreme Court in 1989, which upheld the conviction, but criticized Snow's "disturbing and irresponsible conduct." Snow responded to the criticism by saying, "Probably the best statement is simply that the jury heard the information that I heard and they convicted him on felony counts, ... It was my role to offer the information that the children had offered me. I testified to what I had heard and what I had seen."

In 2018, a daughter and son-in-law of Russell M. Nelson, president of the Church of Jesus Christ of Latter-day Saints, were accused of participating in a Satanic ritual abuse ring in Bountiful, Utah, in 1985. Nelson himself was accused of using his influence to cover up the abuse. Snow was the therapist of the accusers in the 1980s, a fact used by defense attorneys to discredit both the lawsuit, and the therapeutic techniques used in uncovering the memories of the alleged abuse. The suit was dismissed in July 2020 due to it exceeding the statute of limitations.

Snow continues to believe Satanic ritual abuse (SRA) is a problem, but feels the term is too general. In 2018 she wrote, "It's not accurately portrayed by the generalized term SRA. Child abuse in this context may include any one or combination of the following: multi-dimensional child abuse sex rings, medical/military sponsored mind control, commercial pornography and domestic sex trafficking of children, etc."

Barbara Snow was the therapist of Teal Swan in the early 2000s.

=== Lehi child sexual abuse scare ===
Snow was the therapist at the center of the high profile and controversial Allan Hadfield sex abuse case in 1987 in Lehi, Utah.

In the summer 1985, a resident of Lehi, Sheila Bowers took her children to see Snow, who divulged that they had been sexually abused by their babysitter, the teenage daughter of the local LDS Church bishop. Other parents who had their children babysat by the same sitter took their children to see Snow for therapy. These children also began to disclose sexual abuse by others, with eventually around forty adults were accused of being satanic ritual abusers of children. The Utah County Sheriff's Office and Utah Attorney General's Office began an extensive two-and-a-half-year investigation. The bishop's children were taken away by family services, but returned in several weeks after no evidence of harm was discovered. After the investigation, a Lehi resident named Alan Hadfield was the only one to be charged with abuse.

Before the trial of Hadfield, Snow resigned her position at the Intermountain Sexual Abuse Treatment Center amid controversy over her interviewing methods and opened a private practice in Salt Lake City.

At the trial, a Utah County chief deputy attorney testified that he observed Snow coaching children through a two way mirror. "I was appalled", said the deputy attorney, "[Snow] had so conditioned those children that I had serious concern about using them as witnesses in cases." Snow countered that as a therapist, not a law enforcement investigator, she needed to create an environment where hesitant children who might have been threatened to be silent could feel comfortable disclosing abuse. Judy Pugh, a colleague of Snows at the Intermountain Sexual Abuse Treatment Center, told the court that she was concerned about how children's stories would homogeneously emerge after interviews with Snow. One ten-year-old girl testified that Snow asked her as many as fifty times in one session if Hadfield had touched her, and that she finally relented when she became afraid that Snow would yell at her otherwise.

Stephen Golding, director of clinical psychology at the University of Utah, testified that Snow's techniques were "subtly coercive and highly questionable. There were several inconsistencies in the testimonies of the children. On April 6th, the children accused Hadfield of fondling them as they watched a television program, however telephone records showed that Hadfield was on the phone with Snow at the time the abuse was to have occurred. The children said their father had promised to buy them a toy four wheeler for not revealing abuse, but receipts showed that the toy was purchased before the abuse was to have occurred. Hadfield was convicted by an eight member jury on December 19, 1987, and the judge sentenced Hadfield to 6 months in the Utah County Jail. The court placed an order that barred Gay Hadfield, the mother, from hiring Snow as their therapist.

In 1990, the Supreme Court of Utah granted a review of Hadfield's conviction on the grounds of "newly proffered evidence". The evidence concerned newly-discovered similarities between Hadfield's case and other cases involving children interviewed by Snow, including multiple bizarre and highly specific details being repeated by the children involved in each case, which supported the claim that the children had been fed details by Snow.

In 2002, Snow wrote an op-ed in the Deseret News defending her actions, writing, "Sexual predators are master manipulators. ... We cannot have it both ways, ... We cannot decry child abuse publicly and tolerate it privately if the offender is a white, upper-middle-class member of our religious congregation."

=== Probation ===
In 2008, Snow agreed to probation by the Utah Division of Occupational and Professional Licensing to avoid protracted litigation, for violating the Utah codes of professional conduct and ethical principles defined by the National Association of Social Workers. The state alleged that Snow had convinced her relatives that they were victims of satanic ritual abuse and military testing and that Snow provided fabricated notes from her sessions. Snow admitted to destroying her relative's computer with a baseball bat.

== Publications ==
- "Mild to Wild: Assessment and Treatment of Sexually Abused Children," AMCAP Journal 11 (Mar. 1985): 84-88
- "Ritualistic child abuse in a neighborhood setting" with Teena Sorenson (Journal of Interpersonal Violence, Vol. 5 No. 4, pp. 474–487)
- "How Children Tell: The Process of Disclosure in Child Sexual Abuse," with Teena Sorenson, Child Welfare 1991

== See also ==
- Pace memorandum
- Satanic panic (Utah)
