= Caballo de Troya 9: Caná =

2011 book by J. J. Benítez

- Author: J. J. Benítez
- Language: Spanish
- Series: Caballo de Troya
- Publisher: Planeta (Spanish)
- Publication date: 2011
- Publication place: Spain
- Media type: Print (paperback, hardback)
- ISBN: 978-607-07-0943-2 (Mexican)
- Preceded by: Caballo de Troya 8: Jordán

Caballo de Troya: Caná is the ninth and final book in the Caballo de Troya series, which explores the life of Jesus Christ. Written by Spanish author and journalist J. J. Benítez, the book was published in 2011. According to the author, it marks the conclusion of the series, which began in 1984 with the first volume, Jerusalén.

The book was released in Spain and Latin America by Planeta International.

== Background ==
To write the Caballo de Troya series, Benítez travelled to more than 15 countries and consulted approximately 14,000 sources. He noted that it took him 218 days to write Caná, the longest in the series, describing the process as "very laborious," with the final manuscript exceeding 1,100 pages.

When asked about the sources he used for the series and why he has not made them public, Benítez responded that revealing such information would distract people, which is not his intention. He also mentioned that he discovered "a new Jesus, a divine and human creature," very different from what has traditionally been presented.

== Plot summary ==
In his ninth and final book about the public life of Jesus Christ, the journalist alters the course of history and questions certain claims made in the Gospels, such as the selection of the 12 apostles, whether Jesus burned all his writings and paintings, and that the miracle at Cana was actually more impressive than traditionally described.

== Controversy ==
As with the previous eight books in the Caballo de Troya series, controversy surrounded the content Benítez introduced. The final book, Caná, also sparked debate, to which Benítez responded: "Doubt is a concern for the most conservative sectors, but then this country [Spain] has always been a little too much cainite."

Some have also accused him of plagiarism in writing the series, which Benítez dismissed as "slander."
