= Teal Swan =

American spiritual influencer (born 1984)

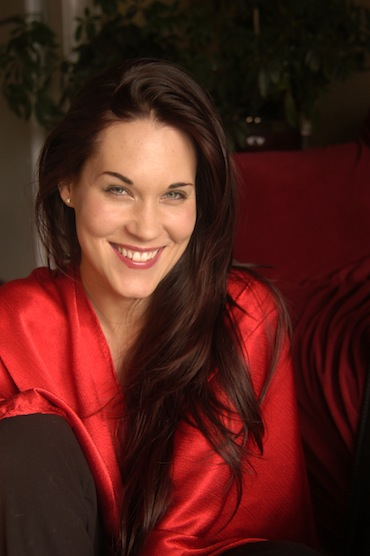
- Swan in 2011
- Born: Mary Teal Bosworth; June 16, 1984 (age 42); Santa Fe, New Mexico, U.S.
- Occupations: Public speaker, author
- Writing career
- Genre: Spirituality
- Website: tealswan.com

Teal Swan (born Mary Teal Bosworth; June 16, 1984) is an American spiritual influencer and author. Swan and her teachings are the subject of documentaries and podcasts. Publications, including Eonline, The Guardian, and the BBC have noted that some of her teaching methods on how to manage mental health issues have been found harmful by her critics, claims denied by Swan and some of her proponents.

== Early life ==
Swan was born in Santa Fe, New Mexico, on June 16, 1984, and was raised in Logan, Utah. From an early age, she has claimed to have extrasensory abilities, including telepathy and the ability to communicate with the dead. Swan reports that these claims contributed to her being socially ostracized and bullied in her youth. This social ostracism, in turn, led to her interactions with the mental health profession.

In 2006, Barbara Snow, a therapist working with Swan, filed a police complaint alleging that Swan had endured twelve years of ritual abuse. Such allegations by Snow were not unprecedented, aligning with a history of similar claims during the period known as the satanic panic, prevalent in the late 20th century. The era was marked by numerous publicized legal cases in the United States, including the McMartin preschool trial, the Country Walk case involving Frank Fuster, and cases in Kern and Thurston counties, some of which were re-examined in later years. The investigation into Swan and Snow's abuse allegations ended due to a lack of evidence, resulting in case closure.

== Career ==
In 2011, Swan released the book The Sculptor in the Sky. That year, she held her first event, at a Salt Lake City recital hall, speaking to approximately twenty people.

Her teaching methods sometimes guide participants to envision their own deaths, occasionally by suicide. Suicide prevention experts have called some of her advice on suicide dangerous. In 2019, after a BBC investigation, Facebook closed her followers' group, and YouTube removed one of her videos on suicide. Swan has denied that she encourages suicide.

In October 2020, Swan's first young adult novel, Hunger of the Pine, was published.

=== Writing ===
==== The Completion Process: The Practice of Putting Yourself Back Together Again ====
Swan's 2016 book, The Completion Process, published by Hay House, details a 20-step healing journey for individuals coping with trauma. It outlines a method involving the creation of a "mental sanctuary" for revisiting traumatic experiences, acknowledging and validating emotions, identifying their origins, and guiding the reader toward relief. The process concludes with a ritual symbolizing a new start.

==== The Anatomy of Loneliness: How to Find Your Way Back to Connection ====
In The Anatomy of Loneliness, published in 2018 by Watkins Media, Swan delves into the issue of loneliness in modern society. It introduces a framework to analyze and address loneliness, represented by the three pillars of separation, shame, and fear.

==== Hunger of the Pine ====
Swan's first fiction novel, Hunger of the Pine, published by Watkins Media in 2020, narrates the story of Aria Abbott, a homeless teenager. Chandra Claypool, in her review, discusses how Aria, after fleeing an abusive foster home, forms an alliance with Taylor, another youth with aspirations for a better future, and together they journey to Los Angeles. Claypool highlights Swan's portrayal of the homeless community, emphasizing the book's challenge to societal perceptions and urging a more empathetic understanding of homelessness.

==== How to Love Yourself ====
How to Love Yourself, an updated version of Swan's earlier work Shadows Before Dawn, explores various methods for cultivating self-love. Central to the book is the guiding question highlighted by Regina Brett of Cleveland.com: 'What would someone who loves themselves do?' This principle serves as a key mantra throughout the book. Swan explores the journey from self-loathing to self-love, aiming to guide readers towards finding self-worth and acceptance.

== Reception, coverage, and criticism ==
The academics Sandro R. Barros and Jennifer A. Sandlin identify Swan as part of a cohort of "conspiritual life coaches" who fuse conspiracy rhetoric with commercial wellness culture, using five overlapping strategies: body purity, reinforced gender binaries, trauma exploitation, appropriation of Indigenous practices, and commodified spirituality.

=== Documentaries ===
Swan was the subject of the 2017 documentary film Open Shadow: The Story of Teal Swan.

In 2018, a Gizmodo podcast, The Gateway, examined Swan's influence over her followers, including her teachings on depression and suicide, her targeting of people experiencing suicidal ideation, and allegations that she promotes suicide and operates a cult. Reviewing the podcast in The Guardian, Miranda Sawyer wrote that Swan told followers that in some cases, suicide hotlines and therapists would not help, and that death "is an immediate relief". Sawyer noted that Swan's detractors call her the "Suicide Catalyst". In the final episode, Swan is quoted as saying: "I have the perfect recipe for a cult, and I fucking know it". She also said her followers "will do whatever the hell I say" and that only her ethics kept her from steering them. The podcast also covered the 2012 suicide of a follower who had sponsored Swan's first workshop in Salt Lake City. The woman's husband said Swan had nothing to do with her death.

In May 2022, Freeform released a four-part docu-series on Swan called The Deep End. The producers of the documentary followed Swan for three years, detailing the rules placed on her inner circle, including those concerning relationships, family planning, and living arrangements. Swan has disputed her characterization in the documentary, citing deceptive practices by the filmmakers. She has shared a petition urging the director to release the unedited footage.

== Personal life ==
Swan married musician Mark Scott in 2006; their son was born the same year. After divorcing Scott, she married French technology entrepreneur Ale Gicqueau in 2016; they divorced in 2018. She resides in Utah with her son.

== Bibliography ==
- Swan, Teal (2011). The Sculptor in the Sky. AuthorHouse. ISBN 978-1-456-74723-7.
- Swan, Teal (2015). Shadows Before Dawn. Hay House. ISBN 978-1-401-94719-4.
- Swan, Teal (2016). The Completion Process: The Practice of Putting Yourself Back Together Again. Hay House. ISBN 978-1-401-95144-3.
- Swan, Teal (2018). The Connection Process: A Spiritual Technique to Master the Art of Relationships. Archway. ISBN 978-1-480-86116-9.
- Swan, Teal (2018). The Anatomy of Loneliness: How to Find Your Way Back to Connection. Watkins Media Limited. ISBN 978-1-786-78197-0.
- Swan, Teal (2020). The Blind Spot Oracle Cards. Watkins Media Limited. ISBN 978-1-786-78389-9.
- Swan, Teal (2020). Hunger of the Pine. Watkins Media Limited. ISBN 978-1-786-78447-6.
- Swan, Teal (2021). The Inner Compass Deck: Follow your Northstar to Find your True Values. Watkins Media Limited. ISBN 978-1-786-78604-3.
- Swan, Teal (2022). How to Love Yourself: Adventures in the Dominions. Watkins Media. ISBN 978-1-786-78700-2.
