= Tooele Transcript-Bulletin =

- Type: Weekly newspaper
- Owner: Transcript Bulletin Publishing
- Founder(s): F.E. Gabriel; Lorenzo Beesley
- Publisher: Clayton Dunn
- Editor: Tim Gillie
- Founded: 1893
- Language: English
- Headquarters: 58 N. Main Street; Tooele, Utah
- Website: tooeleonline.com

The Tooele Transcript-Bulletin is a weekly newspaper published in Tooele, Utah. It has been operated by four generations of the Dunn family.

== History ==
In December 1892, the Tooele Times was fist published by H.D. Trenham, and edited by Newman H. Mix. It ceased a year after the Panic of 1893. In August 1893, F.E. "Gene" Gabriel and Lorenzo Beesley started the Tooele Transcript. In December, Gabriel bought out Beesley and hired J.V. Long as editor.

In 1897, Gabriel died suddenly in the streets after experiencing a lung hemorrhage caused by tuberculosis. His widow then asked James Stirling Dunn, a 60-year-old Tooele farmer, to edit the Transcript. Dunn was a Mormon convert who immigrated to Utah from Kirkintilloch, Scotland. He edited for a few months until Mrs. Gabriel decided to sell. No buyers stepped forward. The Tooele Stake President of the LDS church asked Dunn to buy the paper, but he had no money. So merchant Thomas Speirs loaned him $10 for the down payment.

Many people thought Dunn would fail due to his old age. The paper was unprofitable for several years and Dunn continued farming on the side. The first issue under his name was published on July 8, 1898. He was an avid reader and read nearly 4,000 books during his lifetime. He carried on minor crusades in his paper, and successfully lobbied the city to build a community swimming pool. Dunn was nicked named "Uncle Jimmy" and wrote an autobiography.

In 1914, a rival paper called the Tooele Bulletin was first published. It was founded by Lorin E. Kramer. In March 1922, a fire destroyed the Bulletin's printing plant and caused $3,000 of damage. In 1919, Dunn retired. In January 1923, Dunn died at age 85. The Transcript was inherited by his daughter Martha Dunn and son Alex F. Dunn. That November, the Dunn family acquired the Bulletin from Kramer and merged it with the Transcript to form the Transcript-Bulletin.

Alex Dunn eventually bought out his sister. In 1927, he was elected president of the Utah Press Association. He was known for his practical jokes and became locally famous as a rodeo clown. Under him, circulation grew from 600 to 2,500. In October 1932, a fire destroyed the paper's printing plant and caused $30,000 of damage. The fire was caused after snowfall knocked down some powerlines. In 1964, Alex Dunn died. His son Joel J. Dunn then inherited the paper. In 1994, he retired from the paper and was succeeded by this son, Scott C. Dunn.
