= Hanson Robotics =

Hong Kong-based engineering and robotics company

Hanson Robotics Limited
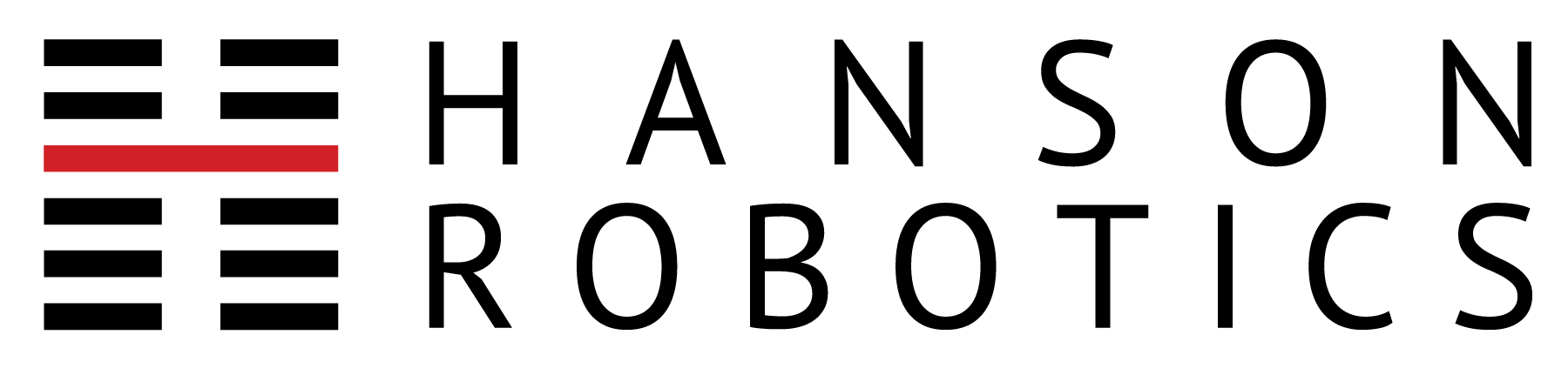
- Company type: Private
- Industry: Engineering; Robotics
- Founded: 2007; 19 years ago in Dallas, Texas, United States
- Founder: David Hanson
- Headquarters: Science Park, Hong Kong
- Key people: Ben Goertzel (former chief scientist); Amit Pandey (chief scientist)
- Products: Albert HUBO; BINA48; Sophia
- Website: hansonrobotics.com

Hanson Robotics Limited is a Hong Kong–based engineering and robotics company founded in 2007 by robotics designer David Hanson. The company develops humanoid robots designed for research, demonstrations, and public engagement with artificial intelligence (AI), human–robot interaction, and expressive robotics. Its best-known robots include Sophia, BINA48, and Albert HUBO.

Hanson Robotics' robots commonly use a patented elastomer skin material called Frubber, designed to mimic the texture and flexibility of human skin. Beneath the skin, motor-driven mechanisms and proprietary control systems enable facial animation intended to reproduce human expressions.

== History ==
Hanson Robotics was founded in 2007 in Dallas, Texas. In 2013, the company relocated to Hong Kong Science Park. Media reports at the time described plans to expand robotics research and development in Hong Kong.

In October 2016, Hanson Robotics was selected as one of nine companies to join the Disney Accelerator program.

== Humanoid robots ==
Hanson Robotics has focused on humanoid robots intended to demonstrate expressive facial animation and conversational interaction. The robots have often been used in public demonstrations and media appearances; researchers and commentators have also debated whether such presentations can overstate the capabilities of current AI systems (see § Criticism).

=== Sophia ===
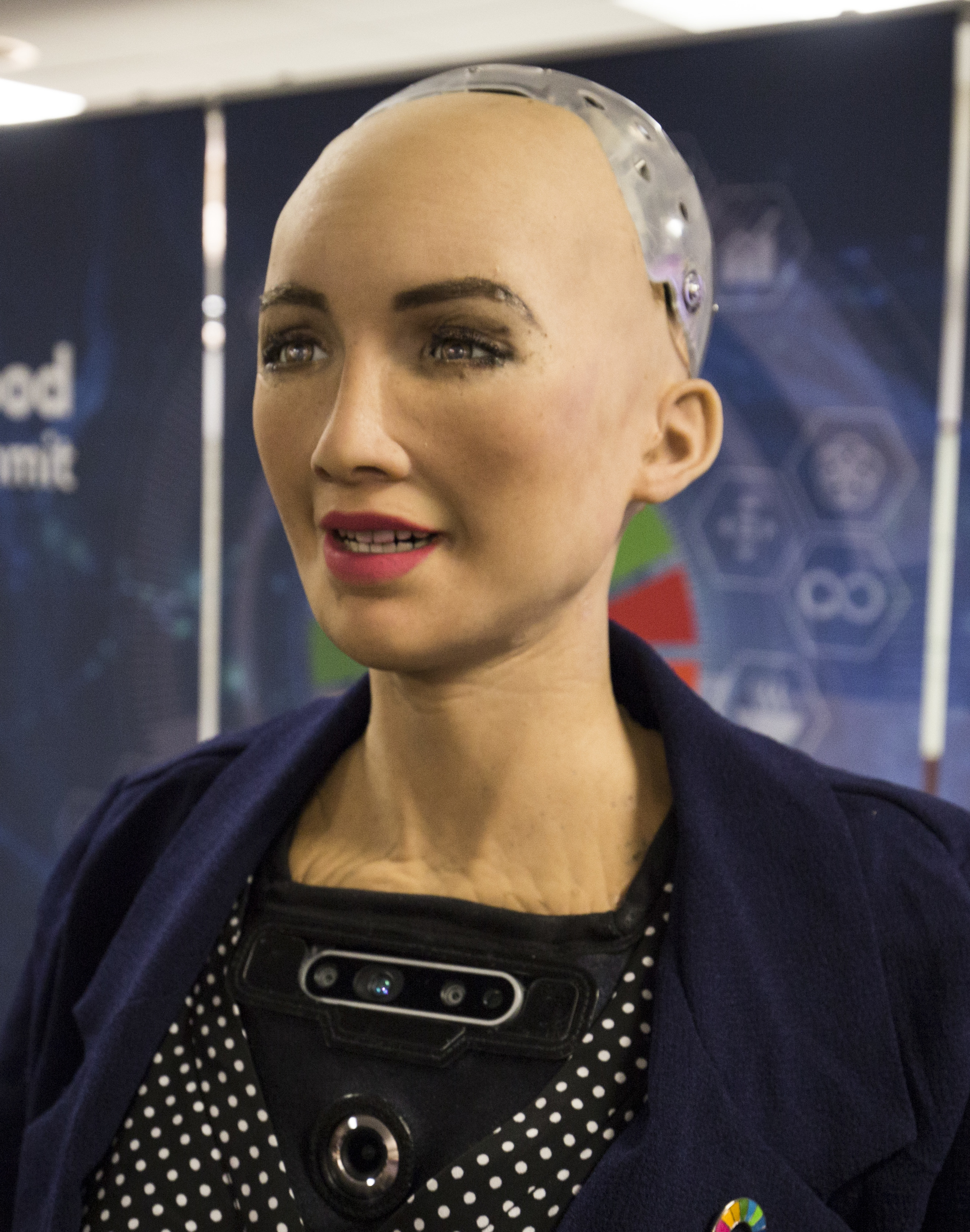
Sophia at the AI for Good Global Summit (2018)

Sophia is Hanson Robotics' most widely publicized robot and has been featured in international media since 2016. Early demonstrations included appearances at events such as South by Southwest (SXSW), including a widely circulated interview with CNBC. Sophia later appeared on broadcast programs including CBS 60 Minutes, The Tonight Show Starring Jimmy Fallon, and Good Morning Britain.

In 2017, Sophia was granted honorary citizenship by Saudi Arabia, an announcement that generated extensive coverage and criticism regarding the symbolic nature of the gesture and debates about rights and personhood.

Sophia has also appeared at events hosted by international organizations, including the United Nations, primarily as a demonstration platform for public discussion of AI and robotics.

Sophia was featured in Audi's 2016 annual report and appeared in ELLE Brasil.

Sophia was named an Innovation Champion by the United Nations Development Programme (UNDP). In 2018, Sophia received an Edison Award in the robotics category.

=== Alice ===
Alice was developed in 2008 for MIRA Labs in Geneva, Switzerland. Media accounts described Alice as an expressive humanoid robot used for cognitive robotics research at the University of Geneva and in the INDIGO cognitive robotics consortium.

=== Albert Einstein HUBO ===
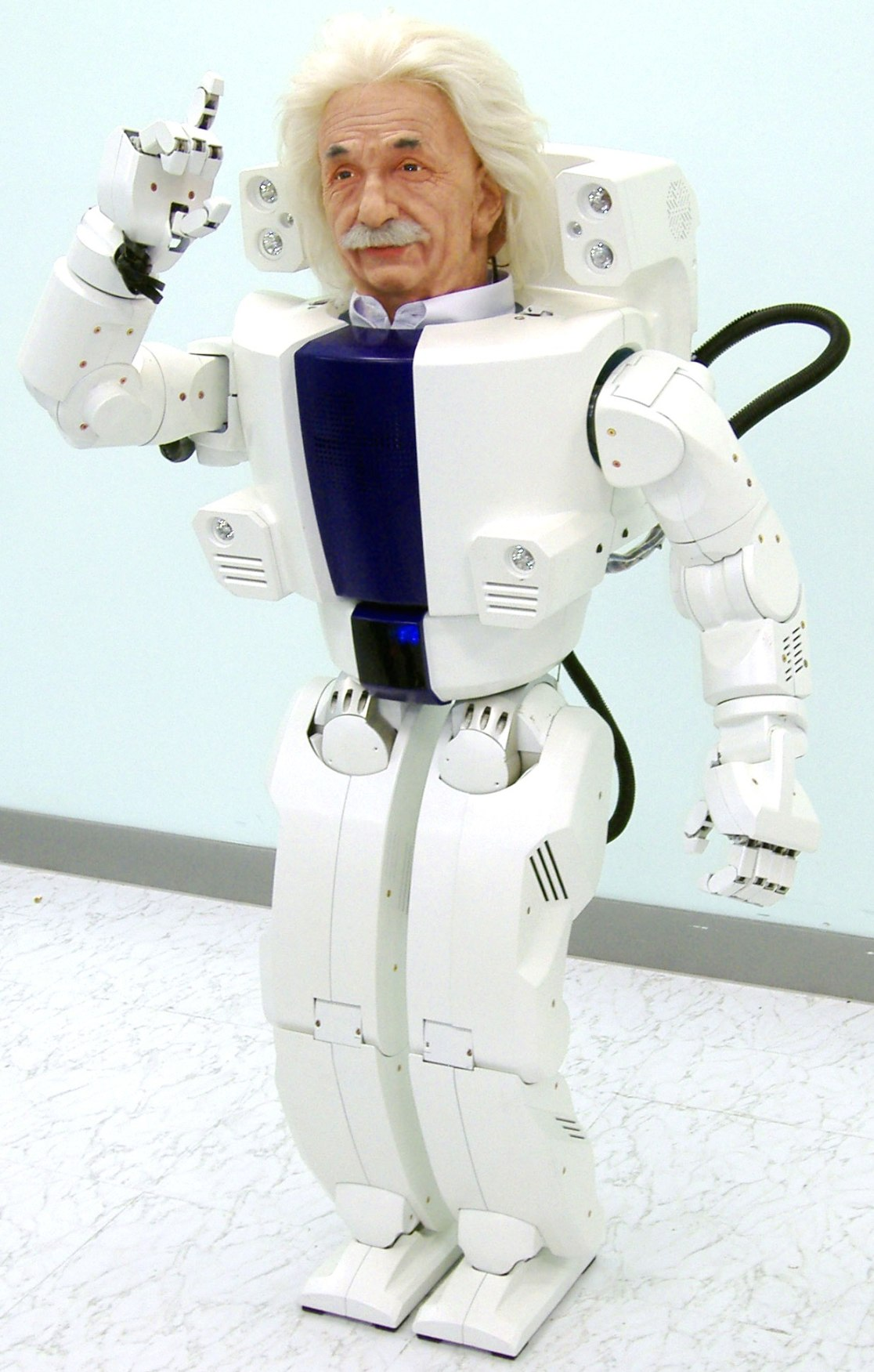
Albert HUBO

Albert Einstein HUBO was developed in 2005 in collaboration with the Korea Advanced Institute of Science and Technology (KAIST) HUBO team. The project combined a HUBO humanoid body with an expressive animatronic head modeled after Albert Einstein. KAIST built the walking body, while Hanson Robotics built the head and facial systems, including Frubber-based facial surfaces.

The robot debuted at the Asia-Pacific Economic Cooperation (APEC) Summit in November 2005. Reports described it as capable of facial expressions and voice synthesis modeled on Einstein. Media accounts stated that the robot was housed at the University of California, San Diego at the California Institute for Telecommunications and Information Technology (Calit2).

=== BINA48 ===
BINA48 (Breakthrough Intelligence via Neural Architecture 48) is a humanoid robot bust developed by Hanson Robotics and introduced in 2010. It uses multiple motors beneath a Frubber skin surface to produce facial expressions. The robot was commissioned by Martine Rothblatt and modeled after Bina Rothblatt.

=== Han ===
Han debuted in 2015 at the Global Sources electronics fair in Hong Kong. Reports described the robot as designed to demonstrate facial expression recognition and replication using cameras and speech recognition technology, with suggested applications in customer-facing roles.

=== Jules ===
Jules debuted in 2006 at Wired NextFest. Reports described Jules as a humanoid robot used to demonstrate face tracking, facial recognition, and conversational interaction, including collaborations with third-party chatbot platforms. The robot has been described as residing at the University of the West of England in Bristol.

=== Professor Einstein ===
Professor Einstein is a consumer robot introduced in 2017 following earlier demonstrations in 2016, including at the Consumer Electronics Show (CES). It was marketed as an educational product aimed at children ages 8–13. Reports described it as capable of speech-based interaction, simple information retrieval via Wi-Fi, facial expression animation, and face tracking using an onboard camera.

=== Philip K. Dick Android ===
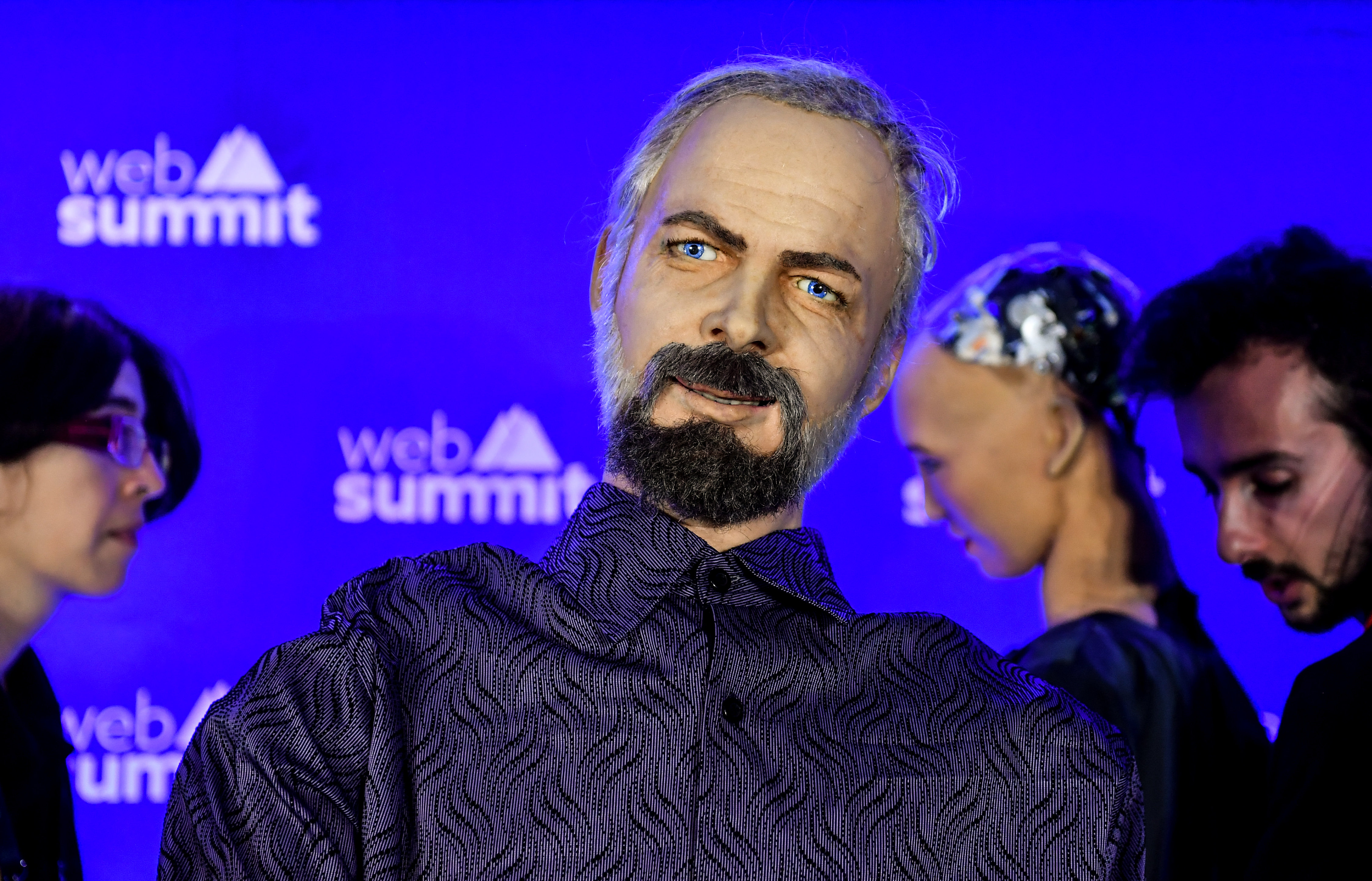
Philip K. Dick Android, 2019

The Philip K. Dick Android is an android portrait of science fiction writer Philip K. Dick. It was first shown publicly in 2005 at Wired NextFest. Media reports described the system as incorporating a conversational model trained on Dick's writings and related materials.

In 2005, Hanson and collaborators received an AAAI award for an "intelligent conversational portrait" related to the project. Reports also stated that an early version was lost during air travel in 2005.

In 2011, Hanson Robotics produced a new version in collaboration with Dutch broadcaster VPRO. Reports described the android as using dozens of servomotors for facial expression and motion-tracking machine vision.

=== Zeno ===
Zeno debuted in 2007 at Wired NextFest. Reports described the robot as capable of seeing, hearing, and speech-based interaction, with an expressive face driven by multiple motors and sensors. An updated version was reported in 2012, with additional servos and sensors for research and demonstration use.

=== Joey Chaos ===
Joey Chaos was unveiled at the 2007 RoboBusiness Conference and Expo in Boston, Massachusetts. Reports described it as a platform used to study human–robot interaction, including face tracking and speech recognition.

== Criticism ==
Hanson Robotics' humanoid robots—particularly Sophia—have drawn criticism from AI researchers and commentators who argue that media presentations can exaggerate the autonomy and intelligence of such systems. Yann LeCun has described Sophia as a "puppet" and criticized portrayals that suggest capabilities beyond what the underlying technology supports.

The 2017 announcement that Sophia had received Saudi citizenship was also criticized, including discussion of the symbolic nature of the gesture and comparisons to the challenges faced by human residents seeking citizenship.

== Awards ==
- Gold Medal, Edison Innovation Awards, 2018
- Winner of 2009 Italian Centro Nationale Riserche (CNR) Scholarship, 2008–2009
- Winner of TechTitan's Innovator of the Year award, 2007
- Winner of TX State Emerging Technology Award, 2007
- Cooper-Hewitt Smithsonian Best Design Triennial, December 2006
- UTA ARRI Innovation Award, February 2006
- 2005 AAAI award, First Place for Open Interaction (PKD Android)
- NIST ATP Award, "Highly meritorious" designation, 2004 (with funding pending the 2005 Congressional spending bill)
- World Technology Award, nominee and semifinalist: Best IT Hardware, 2004
- Themed Entertainment Association, Best Themed Display Award, First Place for the "World of Disney Themed Store" at Walt Disney World, Orlando, FL, 1996
- Rhode Island School of Design Merit Award, 1992–1996

== Affiliations ==
- Member, American Association for the Advancement of Science (AAAS) since 2000
- Member, American Association for Artificial Intelligence (AAAI) since 2001
- Member, SPIE since 2001
- Member, Visual Sciences Society (VSS) since 2003
