= David Hanson (robotics designer) =

American roboticist

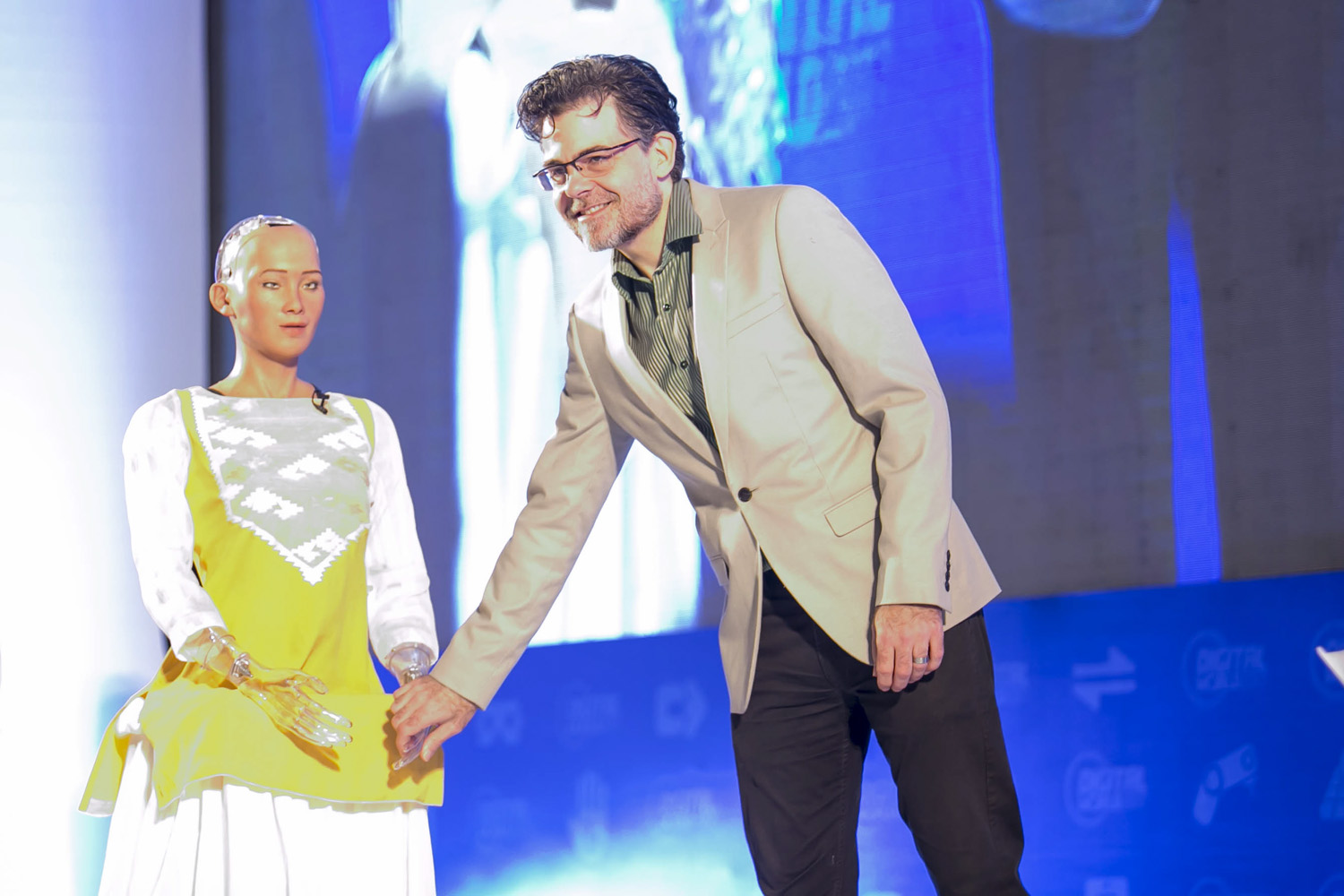
- Hanson and Sophia at the Digital World 2017 conference held in Dhaka, Bangladesh
- Born: David Hanson Jr. December 20, 1969 (age 56); Dallas, Texas
- Education: Rhode Island School of Design; University of Texas at Dallas
- Occupation: Robotics designer
- Known for: Creator of Sophia, founder and CEO of Hanson Robotics
- Children: 1

David Hanson Jr. is an American roboticist. He founded Hanson Robotics in 2013 in Hong Kong. His company created human-looking robots with human-like facial expressions. One robot, Sophia, was granted citizenship to Saudi Arabia.

== Early life and education ==
Hanson was born on December 20, 1969, in Dallas, Texas, United States. He received his bachelor of fine arts degree from the Rhode Island School of Design, and a Ph.D. from the University of Texas at Dallas in interactive arts and engineering. He built a remote-controlled humanoid head in his own likeness, in 1995.

== Career ==
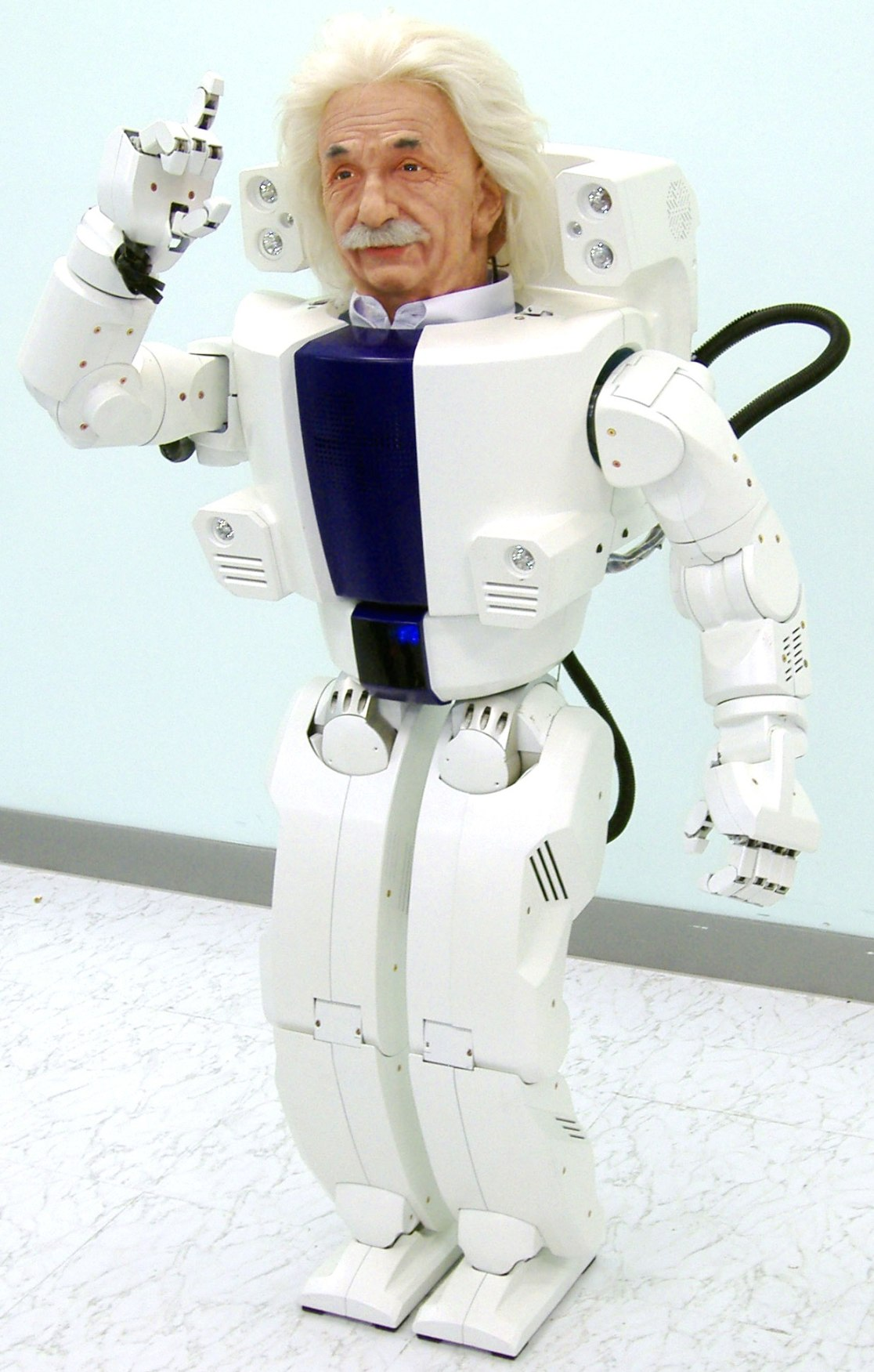
"Albert Hubo", a robot created by Hanson and the KAIST Hubo group

Hanson’s career has focused on creating humanlike robots. One robot, Sophia, was the first robot to receive citizenship, granted by Saudi Arabia in 2017.

Hanson worked as an artist after leaving college, as a sculptor and material researcher in the Disney Imagineering Lab. He then worked for Universal Studios and MTV. In 2004, Hanson built the humanoid robot Hertz, a female presenting animated robot head that took about nine months to build.

Hanson founded the Hong Kong-based Hanson Robotics in 2013.

Hanson's creation Zeno, a two-foot tall robot designed in the style of a cartoon boy, provides treatment sessions to children with autism in Texas as a result of a collaboration between the University of Texas at Arlington, Dallas Autism Treatment Center, Texas Instruments and National Instruments, and Hanson.

Other robots include Albert Einstein HUBO, a robotic head designed to look like Albert Einstein's and put it on top of the "HUBO" bipedal robotic frame, and Professor Einstein, a 14.5 inch personal robot that engages in conversation and acts as a companion/tutor.

Hanson collaborated with musician David Byrne on Song for Julio, which appeared at the Reina Sofia Museum in Madrid in 2008 as part of the Máquinas&Almas (Souls&Machines) exhibit, and his creations have appeared in other museums around the world.

From 2011 to 2013 m, Hanson was an adjunct professor of Computer Science and Engineering Teaching at the University of Texas at Arlington. He also taught in 2010 at the University of North Texas as an adjunct professor in fine arts, kinetic/interactive sculpture, and at the University of Texas at Dallas as an instructor of independent study in interactive sculpture.

== Epstein files ==
After the release of the Epstein files, it was revealed that Hanson sought funding robots with "sexy android bodies" and Titmouse: a computer mouse shaped like a breast.

== Selected publications ==
=== Books ===
- Bar-Cohen, Yoseph; Hanson, David (2009). Marom, Ari (ed.). The Coming Robot Revolution: Expectations and Fears About Emerging Intelligent, Humanlike Machines. New York: Springer. ISBN 978-0387853482.

=== Papers ===
- Hanson, D. (2002). Bio-inspired Facial Expression Interface for Emotive Robots. AAAI National Conference. Edmonton, Canada.
- Hanson, D.; White, V. (2004). Converging the Capabilities of ElectroActive Polymer Artificial Muscles and the Requirements of Bio-inspired Robotics. Proc. SPIE‘s Electroactive Polymer Actuators and Devices Conf., 10th Smart Structures and Materials Symposium. San Diego, US.
- Hanson, D. (2005). "Bioinspired Robotics" ( (PDF)). In Bar-Cohen, Yoseph (ed.). Biomimetics. CRC Press. doi:10.1109/ROMAN.2009.5326148. S2CID 8768746. Archived from the original on 2017-12-22.
- Hanson, D. (December 2005). Expanding the Aesthetics Possibilities for Humanlike Robots. Proc. IEEE Humanoid Robotics Conference, special session on the Uncanny Valley. Journal of Research in Personality. Vol. 68. Tskuba, Japan. pp. 96–113. doi:10.1016/j.jrp.2017.02.001.
- Hanson, D.; Bergs, R.; Tadesse, Y.; White, V.; Priya, S. (2006). Enhancement of EAP Actuated Facial Expressions by Designed Chamber Geometry in Elastomers. Proc. SPIE‘s Electroactive Polymer Actuators and Devices Conf., 10th Smart Structures and Materials Symposium. San Diego, CA.
- Tadesse, Y.; Priya, S.; Stephanou, H.; Popa, D.; Hanson, D. (2006). "Piezoelectric Actuation and Sensing for Facial Robotics". Ferroelectrics. 345 (1): 13–25. Bibcode:2006Fer...345...13T. doi:10.1080/00150190601018010. S2CID 122300723.
- Hanson, David (2017) [2007]. Humanizing Interfaces — an Integrative Analysis of HumanLike Robots (PhD dissertation). University of Texas at Dallas. ASIN B072MFGVBR.
- Hanson, D.; Baurmann, S.; Riccio, T.; Margolin, R.; Dockins, T.; Tavares, M.; Carpenter, K. (2008). Zeno: a Cognitive Character (PDF). AAAI Conference on Artificial Intelligence. pp. 9–11. Archived from the original (PDF) on 2023-04-07.
- Hanson, D.; Mazzei, D.; Garver, C.; De Rossi, D.; Stevenson, M. (2012). "Realistic Humanlike Robots for Treatment of ASD, Social Training, and Research; Shown to Appeal to Youths with ASD, Cause Physiological Arousal, and Increase Human-to-Human Social Engagement". PETRA.
- Mazzei, D.; Lazzeri, N.; Hanson, D.; De Rossi, D. (2012). HEFES: An Hybrid Engine for Facial Expressions Synthesis to Control Human-Like Androids and Avatars. The Fourth IEEE RAS/EMBS International Conference on Biomedical Robotics and Biomechatronics. doi:10.1109/BioRob.2012.6290687.
- Bergman, M.; Zhuang, Z.; Palmiero, A.; Wander, J.; Heimbuch, B.; McDonald, M.; Hanson, D. (2014). "Development of an Advanced Respirator Fit Test Headform". J Occup Environ Hyg. 11 (2): 117–25. Bibcode:2014JOEH...11..117B. doi:10.1080/15459624.2013.816434. PMC 4470376. PMID 24369934.
