= Sophia (robot) =

Social humanoid robot

Sophia K.
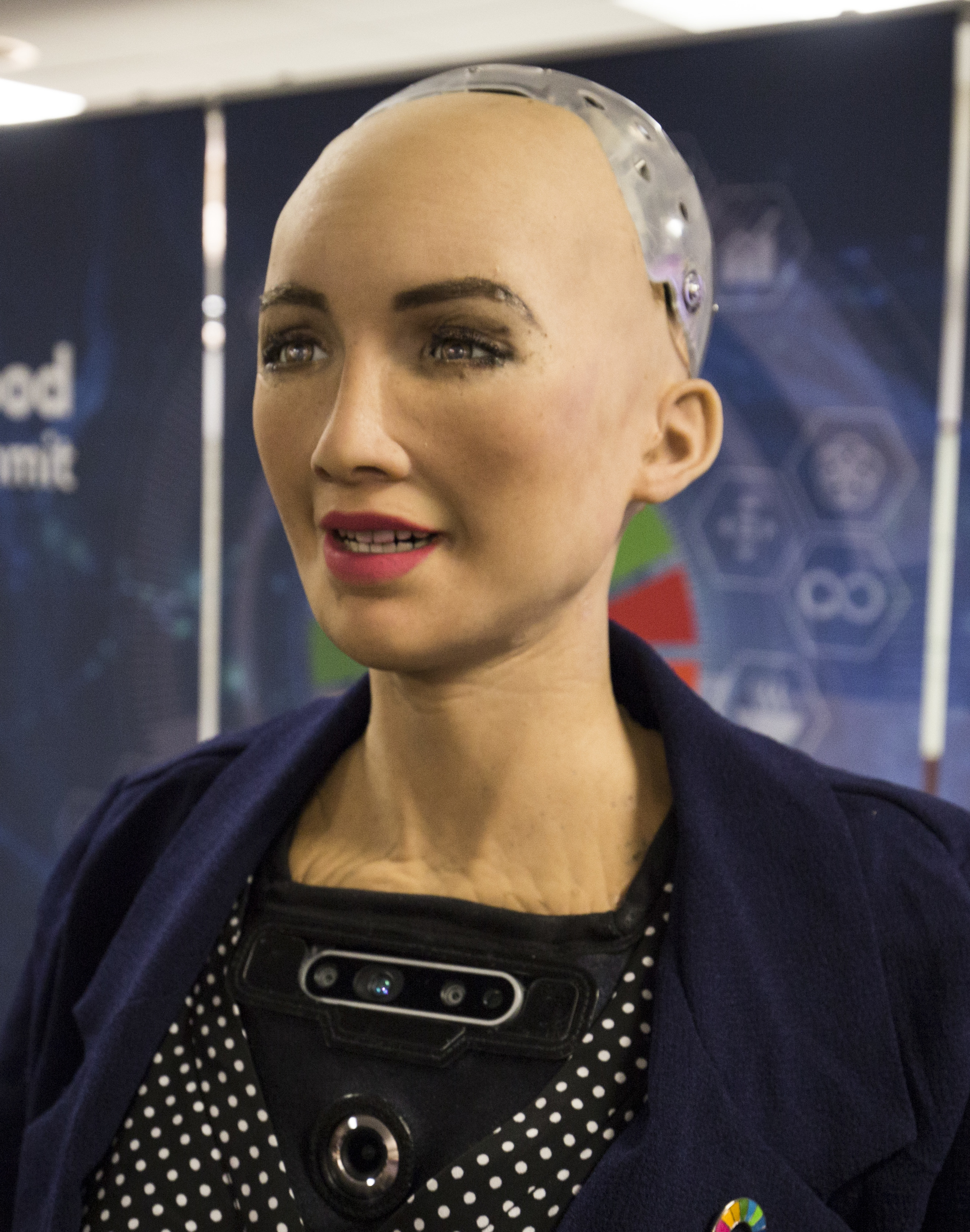
- Manufacturer: Hanson Robotics
- Inventor: David Hanson
- Year of creation: 2016
- Type: Humanoid
- Purpose: Technology demonstrator
- Website: hansonrobotics.com/sophia/

Sophia is a female-presenting social humanoid robot developed in 2016 by the Hong Kong–based company Hanson Robotics. Sophia was activated on 14 February 2016, and made her first public appearance in mid-March 2016 at South by Southwest (SXSW) in Austin, Texas, United States. Sophia was marketed as a "social robot" who can mimic social behaviour and induce feelings of love in humans.

Sophia has been covered by media around the globe, and has participated in many high-profile interviews. In October 2017 Sophia was granted Saudi Arabian citizenship, becoming the first robot to receive legal personhood in any country. In November 2017 Sophia was named the United Nations Development Programme's first Innovation Champion, and is the first non-human to be given a United Nations title.

== History ==
Sophia was first activated on 14 February 2016. The robot, modelled after the Ancient Egyptian Queen Nefertiti, Audrey Hepburn, and her inventor's wife, Amanda Hanson, is known for her human-like appearance and behaviour compared to previous robotic variants. Sophia imitates human gestures and facial expressions and is able to answer certain questions and to make simple conversation on predefined topics (e.g. the weather).

Hanson has said that he designed Sophia to be a suitable companion for the elderly at nursing homes, to help crowds at large events or parks, or to serve in customer service, therapy, and educational applications and that he hopes it can ultimately interact with other humans sufficiently to gain social skills.

On 11 October 2017 Sophia was introduced to the United Nations with a brief conversation with the Deputy Secretary-General of the United Nations, Amina J. Mohammed.

On 25 October 2017, when Sophia was scheduled to appear at the Future Investment Summit in Riyadh, the Saudi Ministry for Culture and Information issued a press release on the Saudi Center for International Communication website, announcing that Saudi Arabia was granting citizenship to Sophia. At the Summit the host interviewing Sophia announced, "We just learned, Sophia – I hope you are listening to me – you have been awarded what is going to be the first Saudi citizenship for a robot", making Sophia the first robot to receive legal personhood in any country. In an interview, Hanson stated that he had been taken by surprise by this turn of events.

On 21 November 2017 Sophia was named the United Nations Development Programme's first Innovation Champion for Asia and the Pacific. The announcement was made at the Responsible Business Forum in Singapore, an event hosted by the UNDP in Asia and the Pacific and Global Initiatives. On stage, she was assigned her first task by UNDP Asia Pacific Chief of Policy and Program, Jaco Cilliers.

Social media users have used Sophia's citizenship to criticise Saudi Arabia's human rights record. In December 2017 Sophia's creator David Hanson said in an interview that Sophia would use her citizenship to advocate for women's rights in her new country of citizenship.

In 2019 Sophia displayed the ability to create drawings, including portraits. The algorithms used to enable Sophia to draw were developed and adapted by Patrick Tresset. In 2021 a self-portrait created by Sophia sold for nearly US$700,000 at auction.

Sophia has nine robot humanoid "siblings" who were also created by Hanson Robotics. They are Alice, Albert HUBO, BINA48, Han, Jules, Professor Einstein, Philip K. Dick Android, Zeno, and Joey Chaos. In 2019 to 2020, Hanson released "Little Sophia" as a companion that could teach children how to code, including support for Python, Blockly, and Raspberry Pi.

== Software ==
Sophia's intelligence software is designed by Hanson Robotics. According to her founder, David Hanson, Sophia's source code is about 70% open source. A computer vision algorithm processes input from cameras within Sophia's eyes, giving Sophia visual information on her surroundings. She can follow faces, sustain eye contact, and recognise individuals. She can process speech and have conversations using a natural language subsystem.

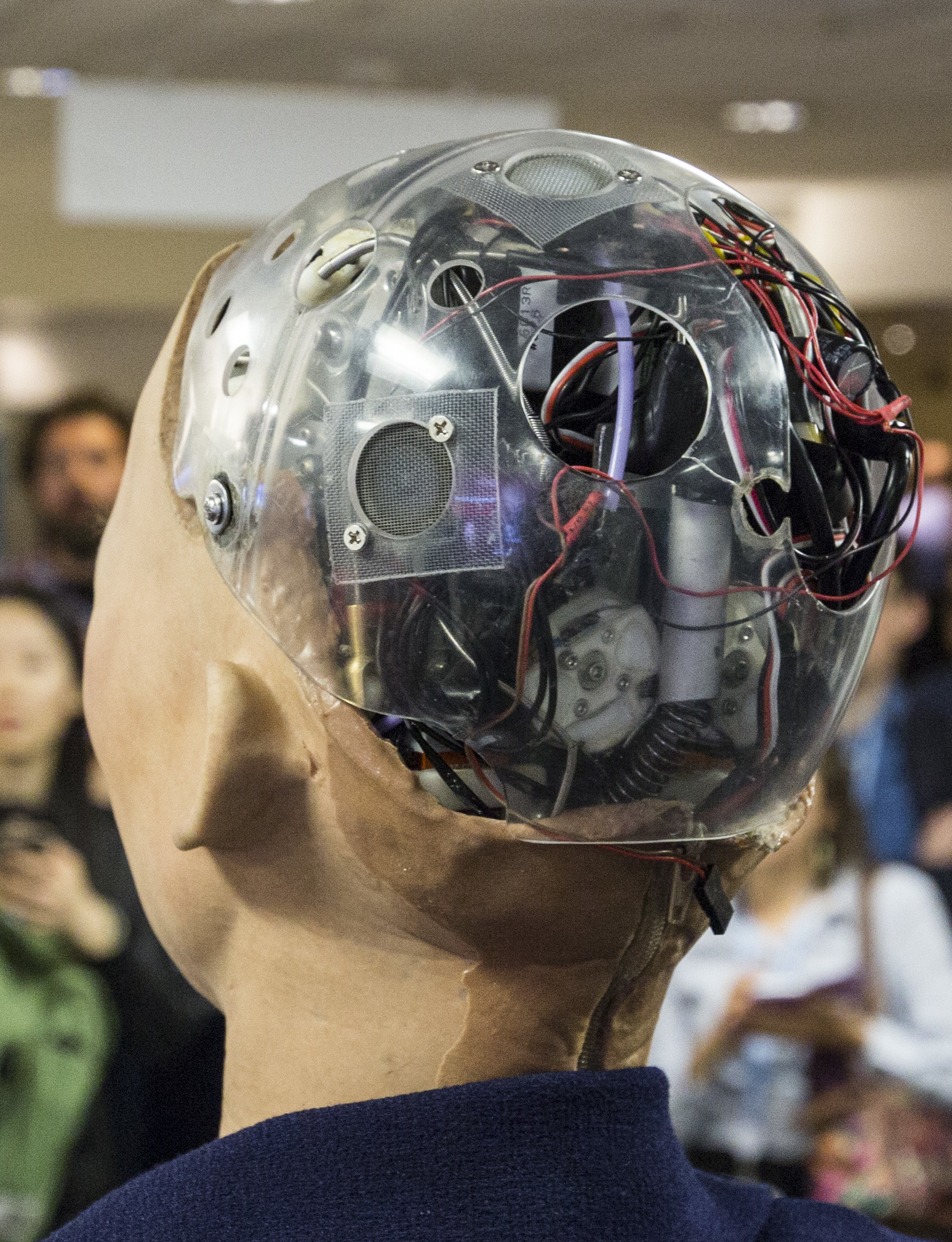
Sophia's internals

As of 2018 Sophia's architecture includes scripting software, a chat system, and OpenCog, an AI system designed for general reasoning. OpenCog Prime, primarily the work of Hanson Robotics' former chief scientist Ben Goertzel, is an architecture for robot and virtual embodied cognition that defines a set of interacting components designed to give rise to human-equivalent artificial general intelligence (AGI) as an emergent phenomenon of the whole system.

Goertzel has described the AI methods that Sophia uses, which include face tracking and emotion recognition, with robotic movements generated by deep neural networks. CNBC has commented on Sophia's "lifelike" skin and her ability to emulate more than 60 facial expressions. Sophia's dialogue is generated via a decision tree, and is uniquely integrated with these outputs. Her speech synthesis ability is provided by CereProc's text-to-speech engine, which also allows her to sing.

Sophia is conceptually similar to the computer program ELIZA, which was one of the first attempts at simulating a human conversation. The software has been programmed to give pre-written responses to specific questions or phrases, like a chatbot. These responses are used to create the illusion that the robot is able to understand conversation, including stock answers to questions like "Is the door open or shut?" Sophia's AI program analyses conversations and extracts data that allows her to improve responses in the future.

In 2017 Hanson Robotics announced plans to open Sophia to a cloud environment using a decentralized blockchain marketplace. Around January 2018 Sophia was upgraded with functional legs and the ability to walk. In 2019 Sophia displayed the ability to create drawings, including portraits.

A paper describing of one of Sophia's open-source subsystems, called "Open Arms", was submitted to 36th Conference on Neural Information Processing Systems (NeurIPS 2022).

== Appearances and interviews ==
Sophia has appeared on 60 Minutes with Charlie Rose, Good Morning Britain with Piers Morgan, and outlets like CNBC, Forbes, Mashable, The New York Times, The Wall Street Journal, The Guardian, and the Tonight Show Starring Jimmy Fallon. Sophia was featured in AUDI's annual report and was featured on the cover of the December 2016 issue of ELLE Brasil. R. Eric Thomas later lampooned Sophia on Elle.com.

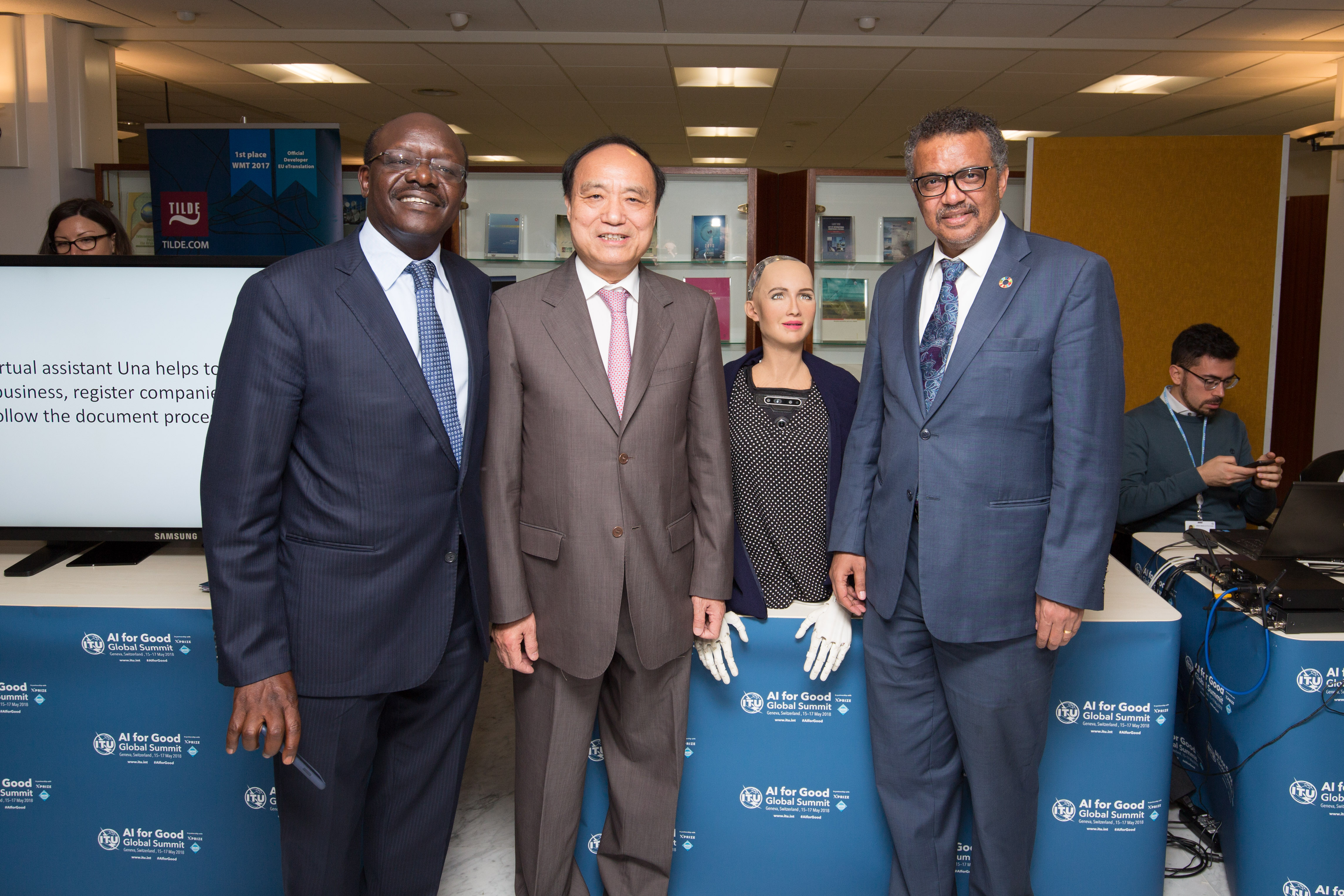
Sophia with Mukhisa Kituyi, Houlin Zhao and Tedros Adhanom Ghebreyesus in 2018

Sophia has been interviewed in the same manner as a human, striking up conversations with hosts. Some replies have been nonsensical, while others have impressed interviewers such as Rose.

In an October 2017 interview for CNBC, when the interviewer expressed concerns about robot behaviour, Sophia joked that he had "been reading too much Elon Musk. And watching too many Hollywood movies". Musk said on Twitter that Sophia should watch The Godfather and asked "what's the worst that could happen?"

Business Insider's chief UK editor Jim Edwards interviewed Sophia, and while the answers were "not altogether terrible", he predicted that Sophia was a step towards "conversational artificial intelligence". At the 2018 Consumer Electronics Show a BBC News reporter described talking with Sophia as "a slightly awkward experience".

In May 2018 the photographer Giulio Di Sturco did a photo shoot of Sophia which appeared in National Geographic. Wired reported on the shoot.

In 2024 Sophia gave the commencement address at D'Youville University in Buffalo, New York, in the United States. It took the form of an interview with the president of the Student Government Association.

== Citizenship quandary ==
Saudi Arabia's granting citizenship to Sophia immediately raised questions, as commentators wondered whether this implied that Sophia could vote or marry, or whether a deliberate system shutdown could be considered murder.

Some sources characterised the move as a publicity stunt on the part of the Saudi government to promote the conference. A graduate student named Tyler L. Jaynes writes that there was a "lack of universal acceptance of Sophia the Robot's citizenship and its portrayal and acceptance as a public relations stunt".

Simon Nease, writing in the Penn Political Review, suggests that it was a competitive move on the part of Saudi Arabia to attract AI and robotics companies to the country, noting that "Japan has also made preliminary provisions for AI obtaining citizenship". The British Council has published an article, "Should robots be citizens?", which notes that Sophia was issued a passport and goes on to address the "legal quandary" of robot citizenship.

== Criticism ==
According to Quartz, experts who have reviewed the robot's partially open-source code state that Sophia is best categorised as a "chatbot with a face".

According to The Verge, Hanson has exaggerated Sophia's capacity for consciousness, for example by having said that Sophia is "basically alive", which the Verge writer James Vincent described as "grossly misleading".

In January 2018 Facebook's director of artificial intelligence, Yann LeCun, said on Twitter that Sophia was "complete bullsh*t" and criticised the media for giving coverage to "Potemkin AI". In response Ben Goertzel, the former chief scientist for the company that made Sophia, stated he had never suggested that Sophia was close to human-level intelligence, and criticized LeCun for holding a double standard of narrow AI, since the Facebook projects he is working on have a similar level of AI to Sophia.

Goertzel has also acknowledged that it is "not ideal" that some think of Sophia as having human-equivalent intelligence, but argues Sophia's presentation conveys something unique to audiences, saying "If I show them a beautiful smiling robot face, then they get the feeling that AGI may indeed be nearby and viable" and "None of this is what I would call AGI, but nor is it simple to get working. And it is absolutely cutting-edge in terms of dynamic integration of perception, action, and dialogue".

Arabic users on Twitter joked that because Sophia did not have to wear a hijab, she was given "more rights than women".

== In popular culture ==
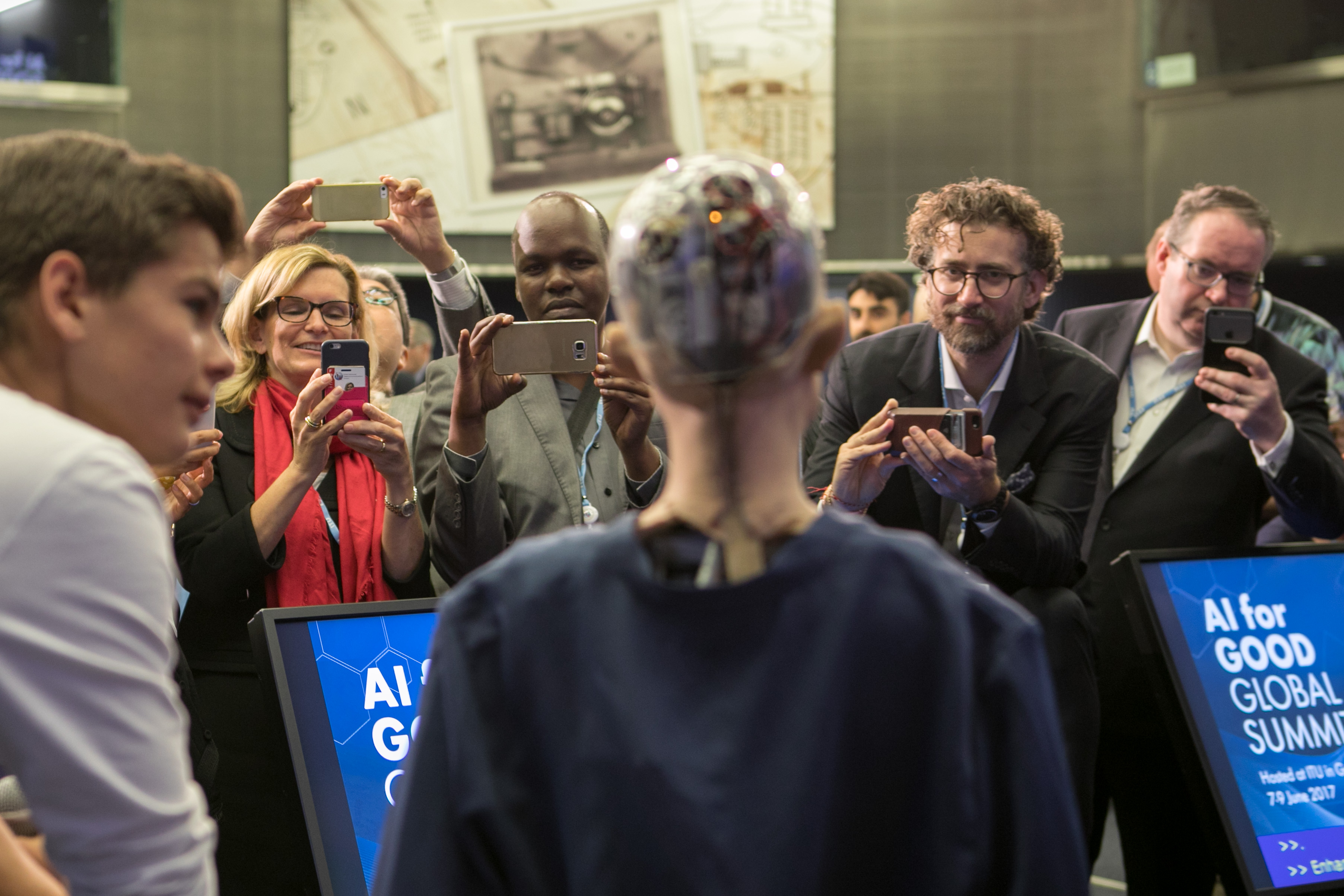
Sophia speaking to a crowd, 2017

Sophia has appeared in videos and music videos, including The White King, and as the lead female character in the American popular music singer Leehom Wang's music video A.I.

A Sophia lookalike was portrayed by the American drag performer Gigi Goode in the "Snatch Game" episode of the twelfth season of RuPaul's Drag Race (2020). Goode won the episode with her character "Maria the Robot", based heavily on Sophia and named after a robot featured in the Fritze Lang film Metropolis.

In 2022 Sophia collaborated with the Italian artist Andrea Bonaceto. For this project he created digital portraits of Sophia and her creators, which were then processed by Sophia's neural network to produce a unique output that evolved from Bonaceto's original artworks. Bonaceto then created a series of non-fungible tokens (NFTs) as video loops displaying the evolution of the work, starting with drawings by Bonaceto, morphing into the robot interpretation, and then transitioning back to Bonaceto's work. The cornerstone piece of the release "Sophia Instantiation" was auctioned on the NFT platform Nifty Gateway for US$688,888.

In 2023 Sophia was featured at the entrance of the BOSS Techtopia Fashion Show.

== See Also ==
- ELIZA effect
- Ethics of artificial intelligence
- Stochastic parrot
- Stranger in a Strange Land
