= Glass (soundtrack) =

Glass (Original Motion Picture Soundtrack)

Film score by West Dylan Thordson
- Released: January 18, 2019
- Recorded: 2018–2019
- Studios: Allentown State Hospital; Feinberg Studios, New York City; April Base, Eau Claire, Wisconsin; Brooklyn Recording, New York City
- Genre: Film score
- Length: 49:20
- Label: Back Lot Music
- Producer: West Dylan Thordson

West Dylan Thordson chronology
| UFO (2018) | Glass (2019) | Queen of Bones (2023) |

Glass (Original Motion Picture Soundtrack) is the film score composed by West Dylan Thordson to the 2019 film Glass directed by M. Night Shyamalan. It is the third and final instalment in the Unbreakable trilogy, as well as serving a crossover and sequel to Unbreakable (2000) and Split (2016). The film stars Bruce Willis, Samuel L. Jackson, Spencer Treat Clark, Charlayne Woodard, James McAvoy and Anya Taylor-Joy, reprising their roles from the previous films. It was released through Back Lot Music on January 18, 2019.

== Development ==
West Dylan Thordson composed the film score, after previously working with Shyamalan on the predecessor Split. The music for Glass was considered a unique challenge for him, as the film being in the same universe as Unbreakable and Split, "one of the concomitant issues of that is that you're talking musical styles from two different generations" as Unbreakable's score by James Newton Howard followed the old-school Hollywood template accompanying percussions and a 100-piece orchestra, while for Split, Thordson went ahead with a Nine Inch Nails-style like score.

When he received the screenplay, he started sketching the musical ideas for the film even before it began production. He then visited the sets, spending a lot of time there, and when looking for a hospital complex with huge empty buildings and a tunnel system connecting there, Thordson noted that he found numerous vast spaces that suited the acoustic treatment and set and assortment of drums and percussions there. After completing a day of shoot, he would record his ideas using a Nagra-style mobile rig with a VR microphone and Coles 4038. Mostly he started to record at nighttime during 9:00 p.m. to 4:00 a.m. which felt "very creepy and uncomfortable" as the venue was very large, and with only few security guards roaming at that time, though he relished that experience. His friend and violinist Tim Fain also recorded portions of the film score at the venue, mostly in the underground tunnel system, but also in the upstairs auditorium and the actual "pink room" where the film was shot. Thordson also turned all the lights off while recording to avoid capturing the fluorescent light buzzing. Thordson noted that "Tim [Fain] was admittedly terrified much of the time, but he never once hesitated on continuing", which led to him giving huge props to Fain.

Thordson incorporated Howard's themes for Unbreakable and revised in his own style musically, becoming a minimized, simplistic and stripped-down version of that film, while also using the original score for the climax sequence. Initially discussing with a possible collaboration with Howard on the music, the team, however, decided not to bring the composer. He also used his own score from Split. Thordson generally aimed away from the superhero film score, in order to attempt for something "a bit askew and nonderivative", owing to Shyamalan's difficult approach to filmmaking which follows a complex and something difficult to achieve cinematically and non-esoterically.

== Release ==
The film score was released through Back Lot Music on January 18, 2019. It was also released in vinyl along with the soundtracks of the predecessors, Unbreakable and Split, as a box set during June 2020 under the Waxwork Records label.

== Track listing ==
| No. | Title | Length |
|---|---|---|
| 1. | "Physicks" | 1:21 |
| 2. | "Brick Factory" (Contains An Interpolation Of "Unbreakable" From Unbreakable by James Newton Howard) | 3:30 |
| 3. | "Pink Room" | 1:24 |
| 4. | "Cycles" | 4:57 |
| 5. | "Backfire" | 1:12 |
| 6. | "Remember" (Contains An Interpolation Of "Carrying Audrey" From Unbreakable by James Newton Howard) | 1:49 |
| 7. | "Escape" | 3:31 |
| 8. | "David & Elijah" (Contains An Interpolation Of "Unbreakable" From Unbreakable by James Newton Howard) | 1:45 |
| 9. | "Pierce" | 2:14 |
| 10. | "Belief" | 3:03 |
| 11. | "Thru the Basement" | 1:11 |
| 12. | "Parking Lot" | 5:13 |
| 13. | "Unraveling" | 1:56 |
| 14. | "Ordinary Man" | 2:07 |
| 15. | "Kevin & Casey" | 2:11 |
| 16. | "Checkmate" | 2:08 |
| 17. | "Origin Story" | 9:48 |
| Total length: | | 49:20 |

== Reception ==
Zanobard Reviews rated the score 6 out of 10 summarizing "Ominous, mysterious and rather melancholic – those are just a few choice words to describe West Dylan Thordson's somewhat unusual score to Glass." S Rockwood of Set the Tape wrote "Glass can, at times, be a difficult listen. Those who prefer their soundtracks to be tonally similar may find the constant shifts here to be frustrating, but given a chance, given more than one listen, there is a lot to like here." Jack Pooley of WhatCulture wrote "Though Thordson hasn't come up with anything as enduring as Howard's work, it's still a rock solid build on his Split score and one of the film's easy stylistic highlights." Owen Gleiberman of Variety and Frank Scheck of The Hollywood Reporter called the score "ominous" and "thrilling".

Sandy Schaefer of Screen Rant wrote "Split composer West Dylan Thordson's score tends to be more threatening and heart-pounding than whatever's actually happening in these scenes." German Lussier of Gizmodo wrote "Some of that malaise can be derived from the score by West Dylan Thordson. He's back after doing the music for Split and again has written a solid score, setting a very specific, tense mood. However, the score only briefly and subtly uses the themes James Newton Howard created for Unbreakable, the robust, invigorating, superheroic melodies that were also used at the end of Split. Because of that, the music becomes almost a metaphor for the movie itself."

== Personnel ==
Credits adapted from liner notes:

- Music composer, producer, recording and mixing – West Dylan Thordson
- Horns, triangle, bells, morfbeats, drums – Reggie Pace
- Violin – Tim Fain
- Sound engineers – Alex Proctor, Andy Taub
- Mastering – Reuben Cohen
- Score editor – John Carbonara, Suzana Perić, West Dylan Thordson
- Music supervisor – Susan Jacobs
- Assistant music supervisor – Jackie Mulhearn
- Production assistance – Adam Hurlburt
- Art direction – Kevin Bergeron
- Artwork– Dennis Calero, Jonas Scharf
- Layout – Sue Ellen Soto
- Music business and legal affairs for Universal Pictures – Tanya Perara
- Executive in charge of music for Universal Pictures – Mike Knobloch
- Marketing and production manager For Back Lot Music – Andy Kalyvas, Nikki Walsh
