= Split (soundtrack) =

Split (Original Motion Picture Soundtrack)

Film score by West Dylan Thordson
- Released: January 20, 2017
- Recorded: 2016–2017
- Genre: Film score
- Length: 59:34
- Label: Back Lot Music
- Producer: West Dylan Thordson

West Dylan Thordson chronology
Joy (2015)	Split (2017)	3 Generations (2017)

Split (Original Motion Picture Soundtrack) is the film score to the 2016 film Split directed by M. Night Shyamalan. Starring James McAvoy, Anya Taylor-Joy, and Betty Buckley, it is the second installment in the Unbreakable trilogy and a "stealth sequel" to Unbreakable (2000). The film score is composed by West Dylan Thordson and released through Back Lot Music on January 20, 2017.

== Background ==
In October 2016, West Dylan Thordson was announced as the film's composer, in his maiden collaboration with Shyamalan. Thordson went ahead with a Nine Inch Nails-like style, using a cello sound and turned, twisted and bended it to provide a cutting edge sound. Early in the process, he and Shyamalan discussed on how Split being tied to Unbreakable and what would be the musical approach for the score. He sketched several ideas that were clearly and intentionally influenced James Newton Howard's score for Unbreakable. A piece titled "Meeting the Others" become his reply for the predecessor. However, Shyamalan instructed him to set aside the ideas that influencing Howard's work and insisted him to write something unique for the film. Hence, he ended up focusing the score on not referencing Unbreakable too heavily. Thordson then influenced some of his scores for the film into its sequel Glass (2019).

== Release ==
The original score album was released through Back Lot Music on January 20, 2017. The score was further compiled into a vinyl LP box set that consisted of his scores for this film and Glass, as well as Howard's score for Unbreakable. It was released in June 2020 through Waxwork Records.

== Reception ==
Tim Grierson of Screen International found the score to be "creepy". Christy Lemire of RogerEbert.com wrote "West Dylan Thordson's score and an expertly creepy sound design help make Split an unsettling experience from the very start." Alvaro Zinos-Amaro of Hex Publishers wrote "West Dylan Thordson's score is also consistently engaging and augments the emotions on the screen." Justin Chang of Los Angeles Times wrote "The occasional screams on the soundtrack are often swallowed up by the ominous swell of West Dylan Thordson's score".

== Track listing ==
No.	Title	Length
1.	"Opening"	1:33
2.	"What's Wrong With Barry?"	2:52
3.	"Dr. Fletcher In Philadelphia"	1:35
4.	"A Way Out"	3:01
5.	"Dr. Fletcher and the World"	2:00
6.	"What Are You Up To, Dennis?"	1:14
7.	"Casey Tells the Truth"	1:40
8.	"Somebody Save Us"	2:00
9.	"Last Rites"	3:20
10.	"I Know You Want To Tell Me Something"	2:33
11.	"There Are Things That Are Hard To Believe"	3:07
12.	"I'm Really Sad You Feel This Way"	2:52
13.	"Arrival"	2:08
14.	"Meeting the Others"	3:38
15.	"The Beast Is On the Move"	3:09
16.	"Dr. Fletcher's Death"	1:42
17.	"Casey Meets the Beast"	4:19
18.	"Kevin Wendell Crumb"	2:41
19.	"The Standoff"	3:24
20.	"The Rise of the Beast"	3:38
21.	"Rejoice"	3:18
22.	"The Beast" (Bonus Track)	3:50
Total length:		59:34

== Personnel ==
Credits adapted from liner notes:

- Music composer, producer, recording, mixing and cello – West Dylan Thordson
- Mastering – Reuben Cohen
- Music editor – John Carbonara, Suzana Perić
- Music supervisor – Susan Jacobs
- Assistant music supervisor – Jackie Mulhearn\
- Art direction – Kevin Bergeron
- Music business and legal affairs for Universal Pictures – Tanya Perara
- Executive in charge of music for Universal Pictures – Michael Knobloch
- Marketing and production manager For Back Lot Music – Andy Kalyvas, Nikki Walsh
