= Unbreakable (film series) =

American superhero thriller and psychological horror film series

- Blu-ray box set of the trilogy
- Directed by: M. Night Shyamalan
- Written by: M. Night Shyamalan
- Produced by: M. Night Shyamalan; Barry Mendel (1); Sam Mercer (1); Jason Blum (2–3); Marc Bienstock (2–3); Ashwin Rajan (3)
- Starring: Bruce Willis; Samuel L. Jackson (1, 3); Spencer Treat Clark (1, 3); Charlayne Woodard (1, 3); Robin Wright Penn (1); James McAvoy (2–3); Anya Taylor-Joy (2–3); Betty Buckley (2); Sarah Paulson (3)
- Cinematography: Eduardo Serra (1); Michael Gioulakis (2–3)
- Edited by: Dylan Tichenor (1); Luke Ciarrocchi (2–3); Blu Murray (3)
- Music by: James Newton Howard (1); West Dylan Thordson (2–3)
- Production companies: Blinding Edge Pictures; Touchstone Pictures (1); Barry Mendel Productions (1); Limited Edition Productions Inc. (1); Blumhouse Productions (2–3); Perfect World Pictures (3); Buena Vista International (3)
- Distributed by: Walt Disney Studios Motion Pictures (1, 3 (International)); Universal Pictures (2–3 (United States))
- Running time: 351 minutes
- Budget: $104 million (Total 3 films)
- Box office: $773.6 million (Total 3 films)

The Unbreakable trilogy, also known as the Eastrail 177 Trilogy, is an American superhero thriller and psychological horror film series. The trilogy consists of Unbreakable (2000), Split (2016), and Glass (2019), which were all written, produced, and directed by M. Night Shyamalan.

The franchise features the character David Dunn, a man who discovers he has the abilities of a superhero. The series has been noted for its differences from more traditional superhero films, with Shyamalan's work referred to as "the first auteur shared superhero universe". It is the first superhero franchise that is written and directed by one person, in comparison to other popular films in the genre. Shyamalan has noted that while it is based on comic book superheroes, and refers to comic books, it is not actually derived from comic book material itself. In contrast to most superhero films, the series is also generally grounded in reality, and is seen as a deconstruction of the superhero genre. The series is thus considered to be a unique take on the superhero genre.

The filmmaker has stated that the films are origin stories of people with unique gifts, with the intent being to acknowledge that every person has something special about them. Unbreakable has been labeled the first grounded superhero film, while Split has been called the first solo supervillain origin story, and Hollywood's first stealth sequel.

== Development ==
The series originated with the film Unbreakable, directed by Shyamalan and released in 2000. When M. Night Shyamalan conceived the idea for Unbreakable, the outline had a comic book's traditional three-part structure (the superhero's "birth", his struggles against general evil-doers, and the hero's ultimate battle against the "archenemy"). Finding the birth section most interesting, he decided to write Unbreakable as an origin story. At the time, comic book themed superhero films were niche, so the film was marketed as a psychological thriller like Shyamalan's breakout film The Sixth Sense, rather than as a superhero film. According to Shyamalan, "I was on a conference call with the studio, and they were saying we can't mention the word 'comic books' or 'superheroes' because it's too fringe".

Upon release in 2000, Bruce Willis revealed that Unbreakable was the first part of a planned trilogy. Both Willis and Samuel L. Jackson pushed for a sequel or trilogy, with Willis stating "It's really built as a trilogy," but Shyamalan expressed uncertainty and said, "I can't tell you anything about them." Whether the film had a sequel depended upon how it would perform at the box office. While Unbreakable was a moderate box office success, grossing $248 million worldwide on a $75 million budget, it performed below expectations, earning about a third of what The Sixth Sense grossed. Unbreakable gained more popularity over time and subsequently developed a cult following, as the audience for comic book superhero films grew over time. Out of Shyamalan's career, some have referred to Unbreakable as his best work. In terms of superhero films, it was listed in Time's list of "Top 10 Superhero Films" of all time, ranked at number four. Quentin Tarantino also included Unbreakable on his list of top 20 films released since 1992.

The second film Split originated from the character of Kevin who had been in one of the early drafts of Unbreakable, but Shyamalan had pulled the character out, stating there were balancing issues at that time. With Split, he brought in some of the scenes he had written for Unbreakable around Kevin. Split became a box office success, with over 2,000% return on investment (ROI), making it the most profitable film of 2017, paving the way for a third film. While Shyamalan has stated that he is usually not a fan of making sequels, the stars of the first film, Bruce Willis and Samuel L. Jackson, had asked him to consider making a sequel. Shyamalan then planned to make a trilogy, finally releasing the third film, Glass, in 2019 as the last. He has said he may continue making more if the inspiration for writing the material is there.

== Films ==
Film	U.S. release date	Director	Screenwriter	Producers
Unbreakable	November 22, 2000	M. Night Shyamalan	M. Night Shyamalan	Sam Mercer, Barry Mendel & M. Night Shyamalan
Split	January 20, 2017	M. Night Shyamalan	M. Night Shyamalan	Jason Blum, Marc Bienstock & M. Night Shyamalan
Glass	January 18, 2019	M. Night Shyamalan	M. Night Shyamalan	Jason Blum, Ashwin Rajan, Marc Bienstock & M. Night Shyamalan

=== Unbreakable (2000) ===
David Dunn is the sole survivor of a devastating train wreck. Elijah Price is a mysterious stranger who offers a bizarre explanation as to why Dunn escaped without a single scratch, an explanation which threatens to change Dunn's family and his life forever.

During filming for The Sixth Sense, M. Night Shyamalan approached Bruce Willis for the role of David Dunn. Sometime after, Samuel L. Jackson and Willis were announced to be the two leads of the film. Prior to the film's production, Jackson met with Willis discussing the script. Principal photography began April 25, 2000, and finished in June the same year.

=== Split (2016) ===
Kevin Wendell Crumb has evidenced 23 personalities to his trusted psychiatrist, Dr. Karen Fletcher, although there remains one still submerged who is set to materialize and dominate all of the others. Compelled to abduct three teenage girls led by the wilful, observant Casey Cooke, Crumb reaches a war for survival among all of those contained within him, as well as everyone around him, as the walls between his compartments shatter.

In October 2015, James McAvoy was cast as the film's primary antagonist, Kevin Wendell Crumb. Originally, Joaquin Phoenix was cast for the role. The same month, Anya Taylor-Joy, Betty Buckley, Jessica Sula, and Haley Lu Richardson were cast in the film. Following cast announcements, Universal Pictures revealed the film's title as Split. Principal photography began in November 2015 and finished in June 2016.

=== Glass (2019) ===
Following the events of Split, security guard David Dunn uses his superstrength and supernatural abilities to track Kevin Wendell Crumb. As Dunn and Crumb engage in a series of escalating encounters, Elijah Price orchestrates everything from the background, all the while holding secrets critical to both men.

Bruce Willis, Samuel L. Jackson, Spencer Treat Clark, Charlayne Woodard, James McAvoy, and Anya Taylor-Joy reprise their roles from Unbreakable and Split. In July 2017, Sarah Paulson was cast as a new character revealed to be Dr. Ellie Staple. In November, Adam David Thompson was cast in an undisclosed role. Principal photography began in October and finished in December 2017.

=== Future ===
Although the series was conceived as a trilogy, Shyamalan mentioned that he was open to a continuation if the inspiration came to him. However, on January 8, 2019, he officially confirmed that no sequels are being planned, citing his lack of interest in building a cinematic universe.

== Themes ==
While the three movies are superhero films, in that unrealistic "super" powers are featured, Shyamalan notes that one of the main themes of the movies is that there are extraordinary powers in everyone. He also notes that rather than being a "comic book movie" each of them is a movie about comic books. While the movies are connected, each has a separate style. Unbreakable is a mystery film, regarding a man who is the sole survivor of a catastrophic train crash. Split is a horror movie, exploring the origin story of a supervillain, while Shyamalan has stated that Glass would have a different thematic feel as well. Producer Jason Blum has referred to them as "superhero movies", noting that they are very different from Marvel Studios' films.

== Cast and crew ==
=== Cast ===
List indicators

This section includes characters who will appear or have appeared in the series.

- An empty grey cell indicates the character was not in the film, or that the character's official presence has not yet been confirmed.
- ^{A} indicates an appearance through archival footage or audio.
- ^{C} indicates a cameo role.
- ^{P} indicates an appearance in onscreen photographs.
- ^{V} indicates a voice-only role.
- ^{Y} indicates a younger version of the character.

Character	Unbreakable	Split	Glass
Character	2000	2016	2019
David Dunn The Protector The Green Guard The Overseer	Bruce Willis Davis Duffield^{Y}	Bruce Willis^{C}	Bruce Willis Colin Becker^{Y}
Kevin Wendell Crumb The Collective / The Horde	Joey Hazinsky^{C}	James McAvoy	James McAvoy Owen Vitullo^{Y}
Elijah Price The Mastermind Mr. Glass	Samuel L. Jackson Johnny Hiram Jamison^{Y}		Samuel L. Jackson Johnny Hiram Jamison^{Y}^{P} William Turner^{Y}
Jai	M. Night Shyamalan^{C}	M. Night Shyamalan^{C}	M. Night Shyamalan^{C}
Penelope Crumb	Dianne Cotten Murphy^{C}	Rosemary Howard^{C}	Rosemary Howard^{C}
Joseph Dunn	Spencer Treat Clark		Spencer Treat Clark
Mrs. Price	Charlayne Woodard		Charlayne Woodard
Audrey Dunn	Robin Wright Penn Laura Regan^{Y}		Robin Wright^{A}
Kelly Woman on Train	Leslie Stefanson		Leslie Stefanson^{A}
Train Engineer	Marc H. Glick		Marc H. Glick^{A}
Dr. Dubin	Michael Kelly		
Dr. Mathison	Eamonn Walker		
The Orange Man	Chance Kelly		
Casey Cooke		Anya Taylor-Joy Izzie Coffey^{Y}	Anya Taylor-Joy
Dr. Karen Fletcher		Betty Buckley	
Claire Benoit		Haley Lu Richardson	
Marcia		Jessica Sula	
John Cooke		Brad William Henke	
Mr. Cooke		Sebastian Arcelus	
Dr. Ellie Staple			Sarah Paulson
Clarence Wendell Crumb			Bryan McElroy
Daryl			Adam David Thompson
Pierce			Luke Kirby

=== Additional crew and production details ===
Film	Composer(s)	Editor	Cinematographer	Production companies	Distributor(s)	Running time
Unbreakable	James Newton Howard	Dylan Tichenor	Eduardo Serra	Touchstone Pictures; Blinding Edge Pictures; Barry Mendel Productions; Limited Edition Productions Inc.	Buena Vista Pictures	106 minutes
Split	West Dylan Thordson	Luke Franco Ciarrocchi	Mike Gioulakis	Blumhouse Productions; Blinding Edge Pictures	Universal Pictures	117 minutes
Glass	West Dylan Thordson	Blu Murray; Luke Franco Ciarrocchi	Mike Gioulakis	Blumhouse Productions; Blinding Edge Pictures; Buena Vista International	Universal Pictures; Walt Disney Studios Motion Pictures	128 minutes

== Reception ==
=== Box office performance ===
Unbreakable was a moderate box office success, grossing $248.1 million in ticket sales on a $75 million budget, but there was minimal profit and it performed below expectations, earning about a third of what The Sixth Sense grossed. Unbreakable underperformed at the box office due to several reasons, primarily because many people expected it to be a similar film to Shyamalan's smash success psychological horror film, The Sixth Sense, which it was not.

Split grossed $278 million against a $9 million budget, becoming a surprise box office success. Split became a box office success, with over 2,000% return on investment (ROI), making it the most profitable film of 2017 and one of the most profitable films of all time.

Film	U.S. release date	US gross	International gross	Worldwide gross	Budget	References
Unbreakable	November 22, 2000	$95,011,339	$153,106,782	$248,118,121	$75 million	
Split	January 20, 2017	$138,291,365	$140,162,993	$278,454,358	$9 million	
Glass	January 18, 2019	$111,048,468	$135,950,571	$246,999,039	$20 million	
Total		$344,351,172	$429,220,346	$773,571,518	$104 million	

=== Critical reception ===
Film	Critical		Public
Film	Rotten Tomatoes	Metacritic	CinemaScore
Unbreakable	70% (172 reviews)	62 (31 reviews)	C
Split	78% (313 reviews)	62 (48 reviews)	B+
Glass	37% (412 reviews)	43 (53 reviews)	B

=== Accolades ===
Film	Award	Date of ceremony	Category	Recipients	Result	References
Unbreakable	Saturn Award	June 12, 2001	Best Action/Adventure/Thriller Film	Best Action/Adventure/Thriller Film	Nominated	
Unbreakable	Black Reel Award	February 12, 2001	Best Film Poster	Best Film Poster	Nominated	
Unbreakable	Golden Trailer Award	2001	Best Horror/Thriller Film	Best Horror/Thriller Film	Won	
Unbreakable	Blockbuster Entertainment Awards	April 10, 2001	Favorite Actor – Suspense	Bruce Willis	Nominated	
Unbreakable	Blockbuster Entertainment Awards	April 10, 2001	Favorite Actor – Suspense	Samuel L. Jackson	Nominated	
Unbreakable	Blockbuster Entertainment Awards	April 10, 2001	Favorite Supporting Actor – Suspense	Spencer Treat Clark	Nominated	
Unbreakable	Blockbuster Entertainment Awards	April 10, 2001	Favorite Supporting Actress – Suspense	Robin Wright Penn	Nominated	
Unbreakable	Bram Stoker Award	2001	Best Screenplay	M. Night Shayamalan	Nominated	
Unbreakable	Nebula Award	April 28, 2001	Best Script	M. Night Shayamalan	Nominated	
Unbreakable	International Horror Guild Award	September 1, 2001	Best Film	Best Film	Nominated	
Split	London Film Critics' Circle	January 22, 2017	Young British/Irish Performer of the Year	Anya Taylor-Joy (also for Morgan and The Witch)	Nominated	
Split	MTV Movie & TV Awards	May 7, 2017	Best Actor in a Movie	James McAvoy	Nominated	
Split	Saturn Awards	June 28, 2017	Best Thriller Film	Split	Nominated	
Split	Saturn Awards	June 28, 2017	Best Supporting Actress	Betty Buckley	Nominated	
Split	Teen Choice Awards	August 13, 2017	Choice Movie: Villain	James McAvoy	Nominated	
Split	San Diego Film Critics Society	December 11, 2017	Best Actor	James McAvoy	Won	
Split	Seattle Film Critics Society	December 18, 2017	Villain of the Year	James McAvoy (as Dennis & The Horde)	Won	
Split	Casting Society of America	January 18, 2018	Studio or Independent – Drama	Douglas Aibel, Diane Heery, Jason Loftus and Henry Russell Bergstein	Nominated	
Split	Empire Awards	March 18, 2018	Best Horror	Split	Nominated	
Glass	Golden Raspberry Awards	March 16, 2020	Worst Supporting Actor	Bruce Willis	Nominated	
Glass	Golden Trailer Awards	May 29, 2019	Best Thriller Poster	Glass (Lindeman & Associates)	Won	
Glass	Golden Trailer Awards	May 29, 2019	Best Motion Poster	"Motion Posters" (Lindeman & Associates)	Nominated	
Glass	Golden Trailer Awards	May 29, 2019	Most Original Poster	"Cracked" (Lindeman & Associates)	Nominated	
Glass	National Film & TV Awards	December 3, 2019	Best Actor	James McAvoy	Nominated	
Glass	People's Choice Awards	November 10, 2019	Favorite Drama Movie	Glass	Nominated	
Glass	People's Choice Awards	November 10, 2019	Favorite Drama Movie Star	Samuel L. Jackson	Nominated	
Glass	People's Choice Awards	November 10, 2019	Favorite Drama Movie Star	Sarah Paulson	Nominated	
Glass	Saturn Awards	September 13, 2019	Best Action or Adventure Film	Glass	Nominated	
