= No Clear Mind =

Greek music trio

- Origin: Athens, Greece
- Genres: Post-rock; art pop; art rock; dream pop; neo-psychedelia
- Years active: 2006–present
- Label: Inner Ear Records
- Website: noclearmind.com

No Clear Mind is a Greek music trio that formed in 2006 in Chania, Greece, by multi-instrumentalists Vasilis Dokakis, Lefteris Volanis and Kostas Rovlias. No Clear Mind have released three studio albums, Dream is Destiny in 2012, Mets in 2013, and Makena in 2016.

== History ==
The band played its debut shows in Greece and Italy in 2008 and are usually joined by a number of fellow musicians for their gigs. They have toured in Europe, played a number of festivals and opened for popular artists such as Ulrich Schnauss and A Whisper in the Noise. Their music received enthusiastic reviews and coverage, while The XX have previously featured them in one of their music blog post series in 2010.

== Line-up ==
- Vasilis Ntokakis – vocals, guitars, keyboards, bass guitar
- Lefteris Volanis – guitars, vocals, keyboards
- Dimitris Pagidas - keyboards

== Discography ==
=== Studio albums ===
- Dream is Destiny (2012)
- Mets (2013)
- Makena (2016)

=== EPs ===
- Matteus Split (2009)
- Alpha (2010)
