= Saturn Award for Best Action or Adventure Film =

Science fiction award

- Awarded for: Best motion picture of the year in the action and adventure genres
- Country: United States
- Presented by: Academy of Science Fiction, Fantasy and Horror Films
- First award: 1994
- Currently held by: Mission: Impossible – The Final Reckoning (2024/2025)
- Website: www.saturnawards.org

The Saturn Award for Best Action or Adventure Film (formerly Saturn Award for Best Action, Adventure or Thriller Film from 1994 to 2009) is an award presented to the best film in the action, adventure or thriller genres by the Academy of Science Fiction, Fantasy and Horror Films.

== Best Action/Adventure/Thriller Film ==
=== Winners and nominees ===
==== 1990s ====
Year	Motion Picture
1994 (21st)	Pulp Fiction
1994 (21st)	Clear and Present Danger
1994 (21st)	The Jungle Book
1994 (21st)	Red Rock West
1994 (21st)	The Shawshank Redemption
1994 (21st)	Speed
1994 (21st)	True Lies
1995 (22nd)	The Usual Suspects
1995 (22nd)	Apollo 13
1995 (22nd)	Braveheart
1995 (22nd)	Die Hard with a Vengeance
1995 (22nd)	GoldenEye
1995 (22nd)	Heat
1995 (22nd)	Se7en
1996 (23rd)	Fargo
1996 (23rd)	Bound
1996 (23rd)	Mission: Impossible
1996 (23rd)	Ransom
1996 (23rd)	The Rock
1996 (23rd)	Twister
1997 (24th)	L.A. Confidential
1997 (24th)	Breakdown
1997 (24th)	Face/Off
1997 (24th)	The Game
1997 (24th)	Titanic
1997 (24th)	Tomorrow Never Dies
1998 (25th)	Saving Private Ryan
1998 (25th)	The Mask of Zorro
1998 (25th)	The Negotiator
1998 (25th)	The Prince of Egypt
1998 (25th)	Ronin
1998 (25th)	A Simple Plan
1999 (26th)	The Green Mile
1999 (26th)	Arlington Road
1999 (26th)	October Sky
1999 (26th)	Payback
1999 (26th)	The Talented Mr. Ripley
1999 (26th)	The World Is Not Enough

==== 2000s ====
Year	Motion Picture
2000 (27th)	Crouching Tiger, Hidden Dragon
2000 (27th)	Charlie's Angels
2000 (27th)	Gladiator
2000 (27th)	The Patriot
2000 (27th)	The Perfect Storm
2000 (27th)	Traffic
2000 (27th)	Unbreakable
2001 (28th)	Memento
2001 (28th)	Black Hawk Down
2001 (28th)	Brotherhood of the Wolf
2001 (28th)	Joy Ride
2001 (28th)	The Man Who Wasn't There
2001 (28th)	Mulholland Drive
2002 (29th)	Road to Perdition
2002 (29th)	The Bourne Identity
2002 (29th)	Die Another Day
2002 (29th)	One Hour Photo
2002 (29th)	Red Dragon
2002 (29th)	xXx
2003 (30th)	Kill Bill: Volume 1
2003 (30th)	Cold Mountain
2003 (30th)	Identity
2003 (30th)	The Italian Job
2003 (30th)	The Last Samurai
2003 (30th)	The Missing
2004 (31st)	Kill Bill: Volume 2
2004 (31st)	The Aviator
2004 (31st)	The Bourne Supremacy
2004 (31st)	Collateral
2004 (31st)	The Manchurian Candidate
2004 (31st)	National Treasure
2004 (31st)	The Phantom of the Opera
2005 (32nd)	Sin City
2005 (32nd)	Flightplan
2005 (32nd)	A History of Violence
2005 (32nd)	Kiss Kiss Bang Bang
2005 (32nd)	Mr. & Mrs. Smith
2005 (32nd)	Oldboy
2005 (32nd)	Red Eye
2006 (33rd)	Casino Royale
2006 (33rd)	The Departed
2006 (33rd)	Flyboys
2006 (33rd)	Mission: Impossible III
2006 (33rd)	Notes on a Scandal
2006 (33rd)	Perfume: The Story of a Murderer
2007 (34th)	300
2007 (34th)	The Bourne Ultimatum
2007 (34th)	Live Free or Die Hard
2007 (34th)	No Country for Old Men
2007 (34th)	There Will Be Blood
2007 (34th)	3:10 to Yuma
2007 (34th)	Zodiac
2008 (35th)	The Dark Knight
2008 (35th)	Changeling
2008 (35th)	Gran Torino
2008 (35th)	Quantum of Solace
2008 (35th)	Traitor
2008 (35th)	Valkyrie
2009 (36th)	Inglourious Basterds
2009 (36th)	Brothers
2009 (36th)	Law Abiding Citizen
2009 (36th)	Sherlock Holmes
2009 (36th)	The Hurt Locker
2009 (36th)	The Messenger
2009 (36th)	2012

== Best Action/Adventure Film ==
=== Winners and nominees ===
==== 2010s ====
Year	Motion Picture
2010 (37th)	Salt
2010 (37th)	The Expendables
2010 (37th)	The Green Hornet
2010 (37th)	RED
2010 (37th)	Robin Hood
2010 (37th)	True Grit
2010 (37th)	Unstoppable
2011 (38th)	Mission: Impossible – Ghost Protocol
2011 (38th)	Fast Five
2011 (38th)	The Lincoln Lawyer
2011 (38th)	Red Tails
2011 (38th)	Sherlock Holmes: A Game of Shadows
2011 (38th)	War Horse
2012 (39th)	Skyfall
2012 (39th)	The Bourne Legacy
2012 (39th)	The Dark Knight Rises
2012 (39th)	Django Unchained
2012 (39th)	Les Misérables
2012 (39th)	Taken 2
2013 (40th)	Fast & Furious 6
2013 (40th)	The Book Thief
2013 (40th)	Jack Ryan: Shadow Recruit
2013 (40th)	The Lone Ranger
2013 (40th)	Lone Survivor
2013 (40th)	Rush
2014 (41st)	Unbroken
2014 (41st)	Exodus: Gods and Kings
2014 (41st)	Inherent Vice
2014 (41st)	Lucy
2014 (41st)	Noah
2014 (41st)	Snowpiercer
2015 (42nd)	Furious 7
2015 (42nd)	Everest
2015 (42nd)	Mission: Impossible – Rogue Nation
2015 (42nd)	The Revenant
2015 (42nd)	Spectre
2015 (42nd)	Spy
2016 (43rd)	Hidden Figures
2016 (43rd)	Allied
2016 (43rd)	Gold
2016 (43rd)	Hacksaw Ridge
2016 (43rd)	The Legend of Tarzan
2016 (43rd)	The Magnificent Seven
2016 (43rd)	The Nice Guys
2017 (44th)	The Greatest Showman
2017 (44th)	Baby Driver
2017 (44th)	Dunkirk
2017 (44th)	The Fate of the Furious
2017 (44th)	Hostiles
2017 (44th)	Kingsman: The Golden Circle
2018/2019 (45th)	Mission: Impossible – Fallout
2018/2019 (45th)	Cold Pursuit
2018/2019 (45th)	Escape Room
2018/2019 (45th)	Glass
2018/2019 (45th)	John Wick: Chapter 3 – Parabellum
2018/2019 (45th)	Skyscraper
2019/2020 (46th)	Mulan
2019/2020 (46th)	1917
2019/2020 (46th)	Bad Boys for Life
2019/2020 (46th)	El Camino: A Breaking Bad Movie
2019/2020 (46th)	Hobbs & Shaw
2019/2020 (46th)	The Gentlemen

=== 2020s ===
Year	Film
2021/2022 (50th)	Top Gun: Maverick
2021/2022 (50th)	Death on the Nile
2021/2022 (50th)	F9
2021/2022 (50th)	No Time to Die
2021/2022 (50th)	RRR
2021/2022 (50th)	West Side Story
2022/2023 (51st)	Mission: Impossible – Dead Reckoning Part One
2022/2023 (51st)	Bullet Train
2022/2023 (51st)	The Equalizer 3
2022/2023 (51st)	Fast X
2022/2023 (51st)	John Wick: Chapter 4
2022/2023 (51st)	The Woman King
2023/2024 (52nd)	Deadpool & Wolverine
2023/2024 (52nd)	Argylle
2023/2024 (52nd)	The Fall Guy
2023/2024 (52nd)	Fly Me to the Moon
2023/2024 (52nd)	The Ministry of Ungentlemanly Warfare
2023/2024 (52nd)	Twisters
2024/2025 (53rd)	Mission: Impossible – The Final Reckoning
2024/2025 (53rd)	Ballerina
2024/2025 (53rd)	F1: The Movie
2024/2025 (53rd)	Novocaine
2024/2025 (53rd)	Now You See Me: Now You Don't
2024/2025 (53rd)	One Battle After Another

== Franchises ==
=== Multiple wins ===
4 wins

- Mission: Impossible

2 wins

- Fast & Furious
- James Bond
- Kill Bill

=== Multiple nominations ===
9 nominations

- James Bond

6 nominations

- Fast & Furious
- Mission: Impossible

4 nominations

- Bourne

2 nominations

- The Dark Knight Trilogy
- Die Hard
- Jack Ryan
- Kill Bill
- Sherlock Holmes
- Unbreakable
- John Wick
- Twister
