= David Dunn (Unbreakable) =

Unbreakable film character

- Unbreakable character
- David Dunn as portrayed by Bruce Willis in Unbreakable
- First appearance: Unbreakable (2000)
- Last appearance: Glass (2019)
- Created by: M. Night Shyamalan
- Portrayed by: Bruce Willis; Davis Duffield (young, Unbreakable); Colin Becker (young, Glass)

In-universe information
- Aliases: The Overseer; The Green Guard / Guardian; The Tip Toe Man; The Float; The Enforcer; The Protector
- Species: Superhuman
- Gender: Male
- Occupation: Security guard Football player (formerly)
- Spouse: Audrey Dunn (deceased)
- Children: Joseph Dunn (son)

David Dunn is a fictional superhero and protagonist in M. Night Shyamalan's Unbreakable film series, portrayed by American actor Bruce Willis. Dunn is a former college football prodigy and a security guard who discovers he has superhuman abilities. He is the protagonist in Unbreakable, makes a cameo in Split, and again is a major character in Glass.

== Development ==
=== Creation and casting ===
When M. Night Shyamalan conceived the idea for Unbreakable, the outline had a comic book's traditional three-part structure: the superhero's "birth," his struggles against general evil-doers, and the hero's ultimate battle against the "archenemy." However, he found the origin story most interesting, and chose to write Unbreakable as one. Willis became attached while shooting The Sixth Sense, also directed by Shyamalan.

=== Powers and abilities ===
David Dunn possesses super-strength, enough to rip off a car door, bench press 500 pounds, break down a steel door, bend metal bars, and hurl a grown man several feet with tremendous force. With nothing to brace against while submerged, he was able to strike the weakened wall of a plastic water tank until it broke. He has nigh-invulnerability that renders him immune to disease and injuries, including traumas and shocks that would kill a normal human.

Additionally, David possesses the ability of psychometry. He is able to intuitively read the minds of others, particularly as they relate to acts of violence and immorality, by touching them. He has demonstrated the ability to discover actions a person committed in the past (such as Price's sabotage of the train and the unnamed murderer's crimes) as well as potential/planned acts of violence (learning a man smuggled a gun into the sports stadium).

=== Weakness ===
David has a weakness to water; being exposed to water weakens him and drains his strength. He had a near-death experience when he nearly drowned at a young age due to children his age trying to push him under water. As a result, he wears a long, hooded raincoat as part of his vigilante disguise.

== Appearances ==
=== Unbreakable ===
David Dunn was born in Philadelphia and became a football player during college, before being caught in a car accident with his girlfriend Audrey. David is left unharmed but Audrey is injured, causing David to quit football to be with her.

In the year 2000, David boards the Eastrail 177 train home but is later caught in a crash. David is recovered and examined by doctors, who reveal he was the only survivor of 132 passengers and that he suffered no injuries. This grabs the attention of comic book art gallery owner Elijah Price, who contacts David, taunting him, convincing him he has unique superhuman abilities. He then interrogates David about any similar past incidents, in an attempt to expose his abilities. This begins to scare David, who leaves the store. The following day, Elijah visits David at the stadium where David becomes suspicious of a man carrying a gun. The man quickly leaves in a rush but Elijah reluctantly follows the man who did have a gun proving Elijah's theory correct about David. He attempts to deny it by recalling a past drowning incident, but Elijah speculates that water is David's weakness. David and Audrey's son Joseph also convinces David he is a superhero, so David decides to do some bench presses, revealing his super strength. He also recalls that he used his strength to save Audrey from the car accident by tearing the door off.

Eventually, David becomes more aware of his powers and decides to test them out in a subway by allowing people to push through him. As people walk past him, David begins to see visions of crimes they committed. David sees a crime committed by a janitor who had killed a man. That night, David follows the janitor to the home, where he finds the same man and his wife, both dead. He finds and frees the children. The janitor pushes David into a swimming pool, affirming his weakness to water. The children rescue David, who then kills the janitor. The next day, David is hailed a superhero in the newspaper. He shakes hands with Elijah, discovering that he caused numerous "accidents" that have killed countless people in his search for a superhero. David later exposes Elijah for his crimes, and Elijah is sent to an institution for the criminally insane.

=== Split ===
David makes a cameo appearance in the 2016 film Split, where he visits a cafe. When the patrons see the news station on the cafe's TV monitors about Kevin Wendell Crumb/The Horde, a waitress states that The Horde reminds her of a man in a wheelchair sent to an insane asylum 15 years ago, as she attempts to recall the man's name. David replies, "Mr. Glass."

=== Glass ===
Sixteen years later, David has become a superhero vigilante named "The Overseer" and is working with Joseph. When not being a vigilante, David runs a home security store.

Having previously learned about the emergence of Kevin Wendell Crumb, a supervillain with an identity disorder involving 24 personalities dubbed by the media as "The Horde", David decides to track him down but is led to an abandoned building where The Horde is holding a group of cheerleaders hostage. David rescues the cheerleaders but is confronted by one of The Horde's personalities "The Beast". Their confrontation is interrupted by a group of Philadelphia police officers led by Dr. Ellie Staple. Staple places the two in an institution where Elijah has been held since his arrest. David and Kevin are put in separate rooms which hold security measures exploiting their weaknesses to contain them.

Later, Elijah becomes interested in the Beast so he decides to free him and team up together to escape. However, before leaving, Elijah contacts David over the PA to reveal to him his plan to destroy the Osaka Tower in Philadelphia before Elijah would expose real-life superheroes. This prompts David to escape his room and confronts the Beast again outside the facility. The fight is interrupted when Joseph exposes that Kevin's father was also on the Eastrail 177 leaving Kevin alone with his mother who begins abusing him leaving Elijah to come to the conclusion of his creation of both David and Kevin's alter egos The Overseer and The Horde. The Beast thanks Elijah for his creation and brutally injures him, then throws David into a water tank in an attempt to drown him. David manages to gather his strength to escape but is weakened by the water.

One of Staple's men walks over to David and drags him over to a nearby pothole filled with water after the tank exploded. The man pushes David's face in the water, which drowns and eventually kills him. Staple reveals that she is part of an organization with the goal of silencing people with superhuman abilities to maintain a societal balance even when David uses his ability to learn this upon grabbing her. Elijah dies from his injuries received from Kevin, who is shot and killed by a sniper. Joseph is eventually sent the security footage of the brawl between David and Kevin at the institution, which Casey Cooke and Elijah's mother also receive. They collaborate to upload the footage to the internet, revealing to the world the existence of superhuman abilities.

== Reception ==
Willis received critical praise for his performance as Dunn in Unbreakable. Critic Roger Ebert believed that Willis' "subtle acting" was positively different from the actor's usual work in "brainless action movies." Quentin Tarantino, who directed Willis in Pulp Fiction, also praised his performance in Unbreakable, saying he considers it his best work.
