= Queen of Bones =

- Film poster
- Directed by: Robert Budreau
- Written by: Michael Burgner
- Produced by: Jennifer Davisson; Michael Hampton; Robert Budreau; William G. Santor; Doug Murray; Ryan Reaney
- Starring: Julia Butters; Jacob Tremblay; Taylor Schilling; Martin Freeman
- Cinematography: André Pienaar
- Edited by: Sebastián Sepúlveda
- Music by: West Dylan Thordson
- Production companies: Appian Way Productions; Lumanity Productions; Productivity Media
- Distributed by: Falling Forward Films
- Release date: December 2, 2023 (Whistler); April 10, 2025 (Lebanon)
- Countries: Canada; United States
- Language: English

Queen of Bones is a 2023 horror thriller film directed by Robert Budreau, written by Michael Burgner, and starring Julia Butters, Jacob Tremblay, Taylor Schilling, and Martin Freeman.

== Plot ==
The film is set in 1931 in Oregon. A twin brother and sister, living on a secluded farm with their widowed father, discover an Icelandic spell book in the attic. The siblings begin to suspect that there is a connection between their mother's mysterious death and the ancient evil forces that dwell in the neighboring forests.

== Cast ==
- Julia Butters as Lily
- Jacob Tremblay as Sam
- Martin Freeman as Malcolm
- Taylor Schilling as Ida May

== Production ==
Filming began in Canada in August 2022. The film was shot in Ontario.

== Release ==
The film was screened for distributors, but not for the general public, in the Industry Selects program at the 2023 Toronto International Film Festival on September 10, 2023, and had its public premiere at the 2023 Whistler Film Festival.

In January 2024, it was announced that Falling Forward Films acquired U.S. distribution rights to the film, which made its U.S. premiere at the Santa Barbara International Film Festival in February 2024. It was later announced that its release would be by Vertical on video on demand which took place on August 1, 2025.

== Reception ==
In his review for Variety, Dennis Harvey wrote: "Without much in the way of psychological depth, or potency to its fantastical elements, Queen of Bones makes a pretty tepid overall impression, given the expectations raised by its basic themes." Todd Jorgensen of Cinemaloque stated: "Emphasizing atmosphere over plot, this bleak episode of folk horror from Canadian director Robert Budreau (Born to Be Blue) is more tedious than thrilling... The strong cast helps inject emotional depth and complexity. However, aside from its period visual flourishes, the deliberately paced film might fit better on stage."
