= 3 Generations (film) =

- Theatrical release poster
- Directed by: Gaby Dellal
- Written by: Nikole Beckwith; Gaby Dellal
- Produced by: Dorothy Berwin; Gaby Dellal; Marc Turtletaub; Peter Saraf
- Starring: Naomi Watts; Elle Fanning; Susan Sarandon; Tate Donovan; Linda Emond; Sam Trammell
- Cinematography: David Johnson
- Edited by: Jeff Betancourt; Joseph Landauer
- Music by: West Dylan Thordson
- Production companies: Big Beach; InFilm Productions
- Distributed by: The Weinstein Company
- Release dates: September 12, 2015 (TIFF); May 5, 2017 (United States)
- Running time: 92 minutes
- Country: United States
- Language: English
- Box office: $680,351

3 Generations (also released in some markets as About Ray) is a 2015 American comedy-drama film directed by Gaby Dellal and written by Nikole Beckwith and Dellal. The film stars Elle Fanning, Naomi Watts, Susan Sarandon, Tate Donovan and Sam Trammell. It premiered in the Special Presentations section of the 2015 Toronto International Film Festival, under the title About Ray. The film was released on May 5, 2017, by the Weinstein Company. In the film, teenager Ray (Fanning) realizes and pursues his true identity as male and his mother Maggie (Watts), lesbian grandmother Dolly (Sarandon), and absent father Craig (Donovan) must learn to accept him for who he is.

== Plot ==
Sixteen-year-old Ray, his mother Maggie, grandmother Dolly, and Dolly's partner are at the doctor getting final instructions on Ray's gender transition. Ray lives with his unmarried mother, his domineering lesbian grandmother, Dolly, and Dolly's partner, Frances. Dolly thinks it would be easier if Ray would just be a lesbian, while Maggie understands that Ray is a transgender man.

Ray is ready to start testosterone shots and change schools, but he needs written consent from both parents. Ray's father is an absent parent and Maggie is afraid to make such a permanent decision. Maggie locates Ray's father, but he wants some time to think. Blaming father Craig's indecision gives Maggie time to stall. On his own, Ray locates his father to find him, married with three children. He also learns that Maggie slept with Craig's brother and that "uncle" Matthew might be his real father. Maggie is the reason he never had a father. Ray feels lied to, alone, and as though he will be trapped in a female body forever.

Grandma Dolly decides it is time for the four to have a man in the house. She now supports Ray's transition to a man. Matthew and Maggie talk. Craig signs the consent form after Maggie also does so. Ray finds happiness.

== Cast ==
- Elle Fanning as Ray, Maggie and Craig's son, Dodo's grandson and Matthew's nephew
- Naomi Watts as Maggie, Ray's mother, Craig's wife And Dodo's daughter
- Susan Sarandon as Dolly (Dodo), Maggie's mother and Ray's grandmother
- Tate Donovan as Craig Walker, Maggie's ex-boyfriend and Matthew's brother
- Linda Emond as Frances (Honey), Dolly's partner
- Jordan Carlos as Jake
- Sam Trammell as Matthew Walker, Craig's brother and Ray's uncle
- Maria Dizzia as Sinda
- Tessa Albertson as Spoon

== Production ==
Beckwith and Dellal began working on the screenplay in the fall of 2012, with Beckwith finishing the first draft in the spring of 2013. On October 30, 2014, Elle Fanning, Naomi Watts and Susan Sarandon were announced to have joined the film. On November 18, 2014, Tate Donovan joined the cast. On November 25, 2014, Sam Trammell joined the cast. Filming took place in New York City and Westchester County, New York, over the course of 25 days in November and December 2014. In August 2015, Michael Brook was announced as the composer for the film.

In April 2016, Dellal posted pictures on Instagram indicating that she was re-editing the film. The score by Brook was replaced by West Dylan Thordson.

== Release ==
On May 15, 2015, The Weinstein Company acquired distribution rights to the film, then titled Three Generations, in a $6 million deal. In June 2015, the film was announced to be released on September 18, 2015, under the title About Ray. It premiered at the Toronto International Film Festival on September 12, 2015, to lukewarm reviews. Subsequently, the film was pulled from the schedule days before its intended release date. In March 2017, it was announced that the film was scheduled to be released on May 5, 2017, under the title 3 Generations.

== Reception ==
=== Critical response ===
On review aggregator website Rotten Tomatoes, the film has an approval rating of 30% based on 44 reviews, and an average rating of 5/10. The site's critical consensus reads, "3 Generations squanders a worthy premise on a thinly written story that focuses on dramatic signposts at the expense of genuine character development." On Metacritic, the film has a score of 47 out of 100, based on 21 critics, indicating "mixed or average" reviews.

Andrew Barker of Variety wrote: "Dellal's likably chaotic direction and a bevy of solid performances make sure the film's beating heart outweighs most of its contrivances."

RogerEbert.com gave it a 2 star rating and said that the film takes on the topic of gender dysphoria with a talented cast but falls short in its execution, resulting in a frustrating and unenlightening journey that sacrifices truth for tastefulness. The movie had the potential to be more entertaining and informative.

=== Controversy ===
The film has been the subject of controversy regarding its casting of Fanning, a cisgender female actor, as a trans male character, Ray. In an interview with Refinery29 in 2015, Dellal stated that Ray is a character who has not yet transitioned during the story, saying, "The part is a girl and she is a girl who is presenting in a very ineffectual way as a boy." Dellal's statement led to criticism from the trans community, accusing her of misgendering. In 2017, Dellal denied misgendering and stated that the comment was "misunderstood", saying, "When I did that Refinery29 interview, it was because I was talking about Elle Fanning as an actress, and I kept referring to her as she."
