= A Whisper in the Noise =

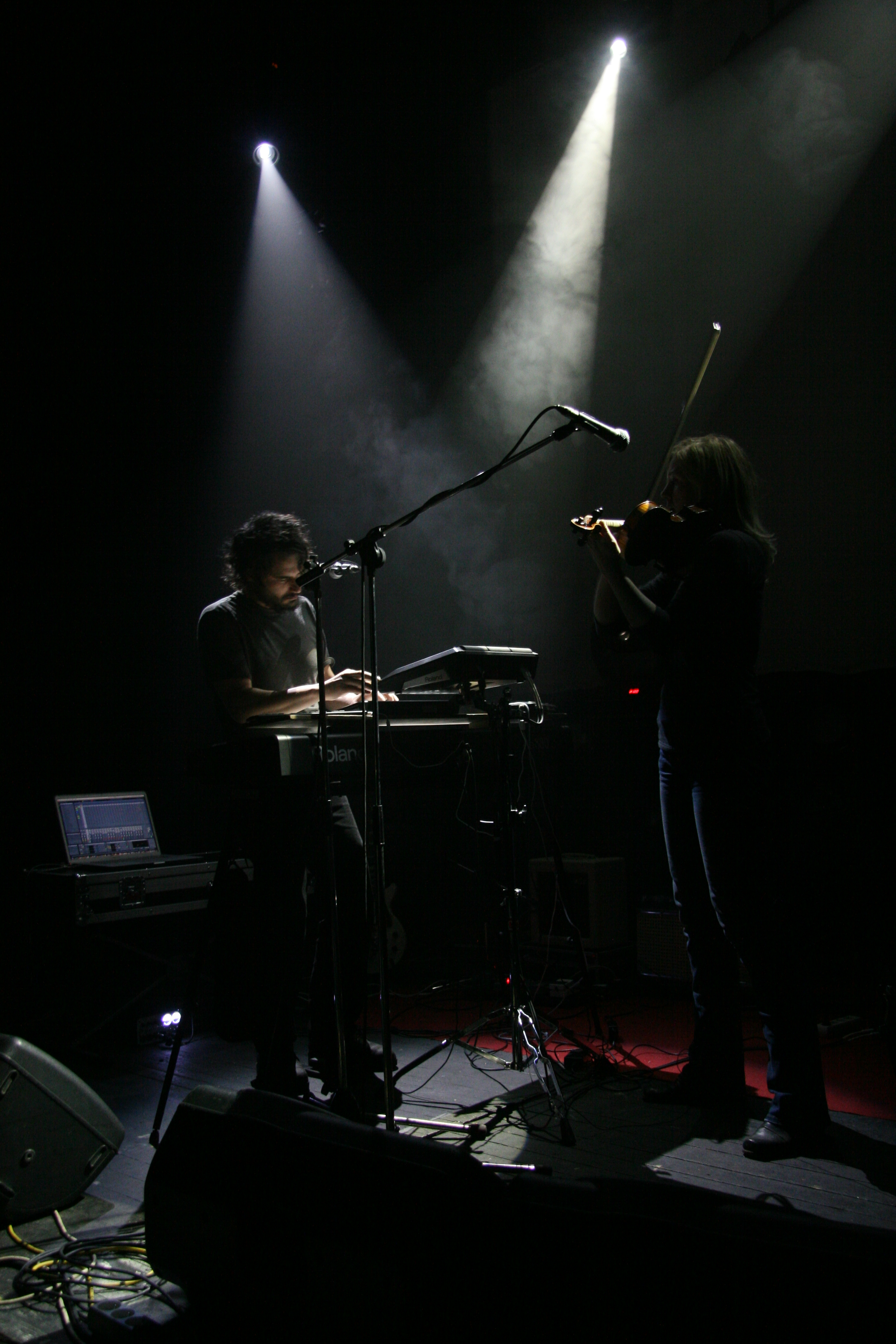
- A Whisper in the Noise, Fléda, Brno, 2012

Background information
- Origin: Hanska, Minnesota, United States
- Genres: Slowcore, dream pop, art rock, post-rock
- Labels: Transdreamer Records; Exile on Mainstream; Southern Records
- Members: West Thordson; Sonja Larson
- Website: awitn.com

A Whisper in the Noise is a musical project of composer West Thordson.

== History ==
Centered in the Minneapolis-St. Paul metro, the group is known for their dark sound and unique instrumentation, as well as their effective live performances. Eschewing the more traditional use of guitar or heavy keyboards that might be associated with the band's umbral sound, the instrumentation of A Whisper in the Noise has included the cello, violin, French horn, synth/electronic keyboard, bass guitar, and percussion in some variation. They have toured as a supporting act for the Scottish band Arab Strap.

The group were attacked at knifepoint after a show in Seattle in March 2006. Less than two weeks later their tour was robbed of $6,000 in Philadelphia.

Their cover of Bob Dylan's "The Times They Are a-Changin'" was featured on the soundtrack for the 2006 film Lady in the Water.

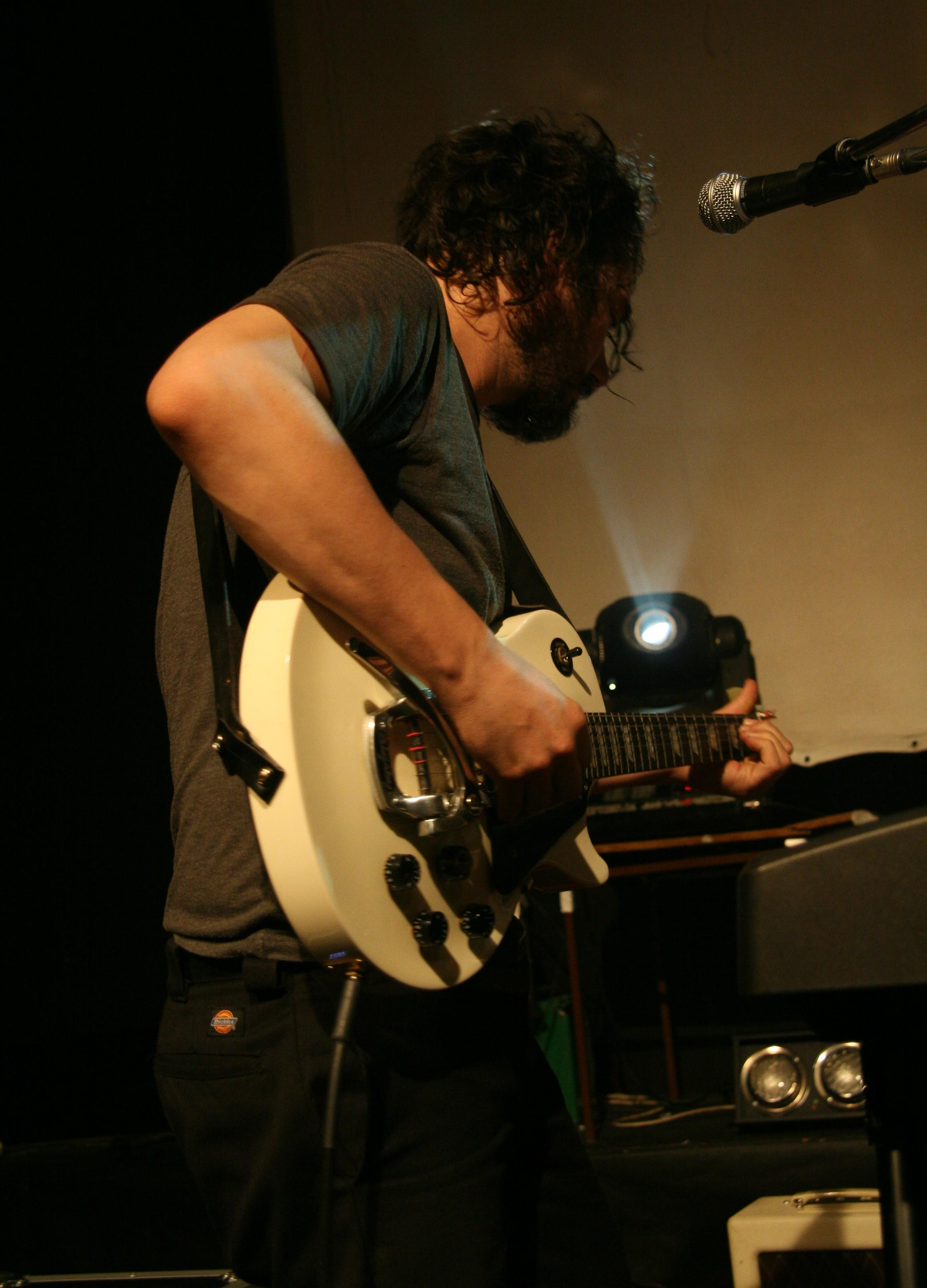
West Thordson

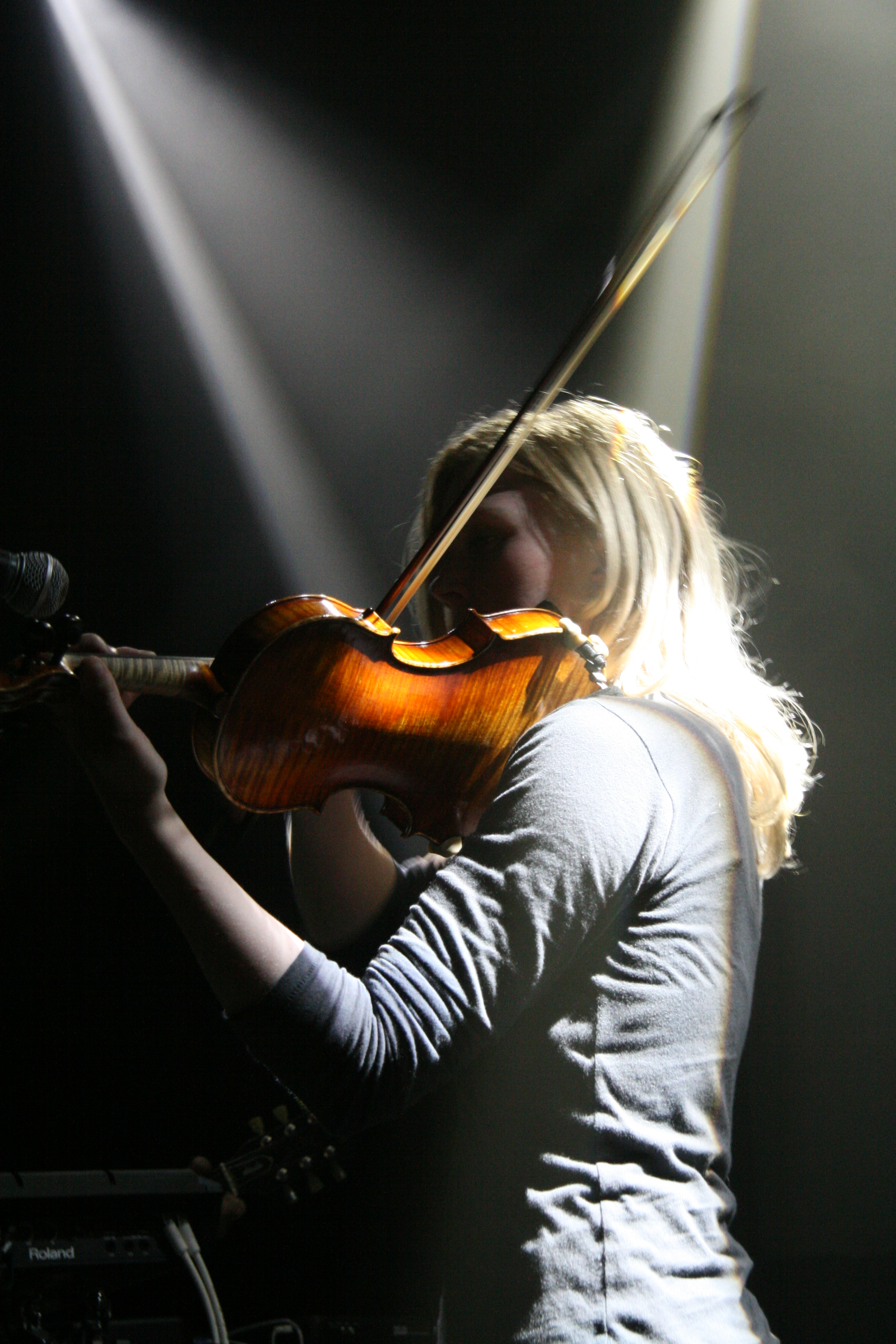
Sonja Larson

== Albums ==
- Through the Ides of March (2002)
- 2D (2004)
- As the Bluebird Sings (2006)
- Dry Land (2008)
- To Forget (2012)
