= West Dylan Thordson =

American film composer

West Dylan Thordson is an American film composer and musician. He is best known for his original scores to Joy, The Jinx: The Life and Deaths of Robert Durst, Foxcatcher and M. Night Shyamalan's Split and Glass. In addition to scoring films, he is also the lead composer, writer and singer for A Whisper in the Noise, with whom he has released four studio albums.

== Selected filmography ==
=== Film ===
Year	Title	Director	Notes
2015	Dixieland	Hank Bedford	—
2015	3 Generations	Gaby Dellal	—
2015	Joy	David O. Russell	Co-composed with David Campbell
2016	In the Radiant City	Rachel Lambert	—
2016	Split	M. Night Shyamalan	—
2018	UFO	Ryan Eslinger	—
2019	Glass	M. Night Shyamalan	—
2023	Queen of Bones	Robert Budreau	—
2024	The Sand Castle	Matty Brown	Co-composed with Kat Vokes

=== Documentaries ===
Year	Title	Director	Notes
2009	The Art of the Steal	Don Argott	—
2012	The Atomic States of America	Don Argott; Sheena M. Joyce	—
2015	Every Day	Gabe Spitzer	—
2015	The Jinx: The Life and Deaths of Robert Durst	Andrew Jarecki	Co-composed with John Kusiak; Documentary mini-series
2016	Midsummer in Newton	Lloyd Kramer	—
2017	Home Truth	April Hayes; Katia Maguire	—
2018	When Lambs Become Lions	Jon Kasbe	—
2022	My Robot Sophia	Jon Kasbe; Crystal Moselle	—
2023	Kelce	Don Argott	—
2025	Taylor Swift: The End of an Era	Don Argott; Sheena M. Joyce	—
