= Split (2016 American film) =

Horror thriller film by M. Night Shyamalan

- Theatrical release poster
- Directed by: M. Night Shyamalan
- Written by: M. Night Shyamalan
- Produced by: M. Night Shyamalan; Jason Blum; Marc Bienstock
- Starring: James McAvoy; Anya Taylor-Joy; Betty Buckley
- Cinematography: Mike Gioulakis
- Edited by: Luke Ciarrocchi
- Music by: West Dylan Thordson
- Production companies: Blinding Edge Pictures; Blumhouse Productions
- Distributed by: Universal Pictures
- Release dates: September 26, 2016 (Fantastic Fest); January 20, 2017 (United States)
- Running time: 117 minutes
- Country: United States
- Language: English
- Budget: $9 million
- Box office: $278.5 million

Split is a 2016 American psychological thriller film written, directed and produced by M. Night Shyamalan, and starring James McAvoy, Anya Taylor-Joy, and Betty Buckley. It is the second installment in the Unbreakable trilogy and a "stealth sequel" to Unbreakable (2000). The film follows a man with dissociative identity disorder who kidnaps and imprisons three teenage girls in an isolated underground facility.

Principal photography began on November 11, 2015, in Philadelphia, Pennsylvania. The film premiered at Fantastic Fest on September 26, 2016, and was released in the United States on January 20, 2017. Unlike its predecessor, the film was distributed by Universal Pictures instead of Touchstone Pictures, which went defunct in 2016. It received generally positive reviews; critics highly praised McAvoy's performance, and welcomed Shyamalan's direction, although some mental health advocates criticized the film for its stigmatization of mental illness. Split was a commercial success, grossing $278 million worldwide on a budget of $9 million, becoming Blumhouse Productions' highest-grossing film until 2023 when Five Nights at Freddy's overtook it. The 2019 film Glass, which combined the casts and characters of both previous films, concluded the trilogy.

== Plot ==
Just outside Philadelphia, three teenage girls — friends Claire and Marcia, and their classmate Casey — are waiting in the car of Claire's father to be driven home from her birthday party. They are kidnapped by a man, who imprisons them in an underground lair. It becomes clear that this man has dissociative identity disorder (DID) rooted in his history of childhood abuse and abandonment. The man has been living with his 23 distinct identities ("alters") for several years with help from his therapist, Dr. Karen Fletcher, who is pleased that the man has been able to hold down a good job. One of these personas, "Barry", has been in control of deciding which personalities get to control the man's body; lately he has not allowed two others, "Dennis" and "Patricia", to have a turn due to the former's tendency to harass young women and the latter's belief in a mysterious 24th yet-to-manifest alter called "The Beast" who plans to rid the world of the "impure"—those who have not suffered.

The captives meet "Patricia," who protects them from "Dennis" to save them for "The Beast," and a 9-year-old boy alter named "Hedwig," whom "Patricia" and "Dennis" manipulate to shut out the other alters. Through a series of flash-backs, it is revealed that Casey herself is a survivor of childhood sexual abuse. She attempts to psychologically manipulate the various alters to gain opportunities for escape. The captives make several escape attempts: one by climbing through an air vent, one by attacking the man with a chair, and one by finding a walkie-talkie and calling for help. The man punishes them for their failed escape attempts by locking them in separate rooms.

During a session, Dr. Fletcher questions the man about an incident where two teenage schoolgirls had placed his hands on their breasts during a field trip to his workplace, and becomes concerned when she realizes that "Dennis" has been impersonating "Barry." Dr. Fletcher goes to the lair to talk to "Dennis" and he confesses that he has met "The Beast". She discovers Claire, so "Dennis" incapacitates and imprisons Dr. Fletcher. "Dennis" goes to the train station and boards an empty train car, where "The Beast" takes over. "The Beast," who displays enhanced strength and animalistic tendencies, returns to his lair, thanks Dr. Fletcher for her help, and crushes her to death.

"The Beast" feeds upon and kills Claire and Marcia before approaching Casey. But Casey finds a note scrawled by Dr. Fletcher with instructions to call out the man's full name—Kevin Wendell Crumb—which brings forth his original personality. Upon learning of the situation and realizing that he has not been in control of his own body for two years, the horrified Kevin begs Casey to kill him with a shotgun he has hidden. This prompts all 24 personalities to fight for control, with "Patricia" the victor. She tells Casey that "Kevin" has been made to sleep far away and will not awaken now, even if his name is called. While "Patricia" returns control to "The Beast," Casey retrieves the shotgun and a box of cartridges and runs into a tunnel where "The Beast" stalks her. She locks herself in an iron cage and manages to shoot "The Beast" twice before running out of ammunition. Only wounded, he bends the iron bars with apparently superhuman strength but stops when he sees scars across Casey's abdomen and chest—self-harm due to sexual abuse by her uncle and legal guardian, John, both before and after her father's death. "The Beast" tells Casey that because she has suffered, she is "pure" and he will spare her life. He leaves and she is found the following day by a worker. It is revealed that the lair is under the Philadelphia Zoo. Later, a police officer tells Casey her uncle has arrived to pick her up, but Casey hesitates.

In another hideout, "Dennis," "Patricia," and "Hedwig" discuss the power of "The Beast" and their plans to change the world. At the Silk City Diner, several patrons watch a news report on "The Beast's" crimes, with the correspondent mentioning that his numerous alters have earned him the nickname "The Horde." A waitress notes the similarity to a criminal in a wheelchair incarcerated 15 years earlier, who was also given a nickname. As she tries to remember it, David Dunn, sitting next to her, replies that it was "Mr. Glass."

== Cast ==
- James McAvoy as Dennis / Patricia / Hedwig / The Beast / Kevin Wendell Crumb / Barry / Orwell / Jade
- Anya Taylor-Joy as Casey Cooke
- Betty Buckley as Dr. Karen Fletcher
- Haley Lu Richardson as Claire Benoit
- Jessica Sula as Marcia
- Sebastian Arcelus as Casey's Father
- Brad William Henke as Uncle John
- Neal Huff as Mr. Benoit

In addition, the film's writer, director, and producer M. Night Shyamalan makes an appearance as Jai, which he reprises in his 2019 production Glass, where his character jokingly says he used to do shady stuff in the stadium back in his youth – referring to his unnamed cameo as "Stadium Drug Dealer" in Shyamalan's 2000 production Unbreakable and completing his character's presence across the Unbreakable film series. Similarly, Bruce Willis has an uncredited cameo as his David Dunn character from Unbreakable, later appearing in the main cast of Glass.

== Production ==
Shyamalan conceived the idea for Split years before he wrote the screenplay. He explained, "In this case, I had written the character a while ago, and I had written out a few scenes of it, so I even had dialogue written out, which is really unusual for me. It sat there for a long time, and I really don't have a clear reason why I didn't pull the trigger earlier. But this felt like the perfect time to do it, with the type of movies I'm doing now, and the type of tones I am interested in – humor and suspense."

On October 2, 2015, James McAvoy was cast in the film to play the lead, replacing Joaquin Phoenix, who had left the project a few weeks before it began shooting. On October 12, 2015, Anya Taylor-Joy, Betty Buckley, Jessica Sula, and Haley Lu Richardson were added to the cast. On October 27, 2015, Universal Pictures came on board to release the film and titled it as Split.

The character of Kevin had been in one of the early drafts of Shyamalan's Unbreakable, but he had pulled the character out, stating there were balancing issues at that time. With Split, he brought in some of the scenes he had written for Unbreakable around Kevin. The film ends with the appearance of Bruce Willis's character, David Dunn, from Unbreakable, who makes a comment in reference to the previous film, placing Unbreakable and Split within the same narrative universe. Shyamalan requested permission to incorporate the character from Walt Disney Studios, which had produced Unbreakable. Shyamalan met with Sean Bailey about the use of the character; they came to a gentlemen's agreement where Bailey agreed to allow the use of the character in the film without a fee and Shyamalan promised that Disney would be involved in a sequel if developed. Shyamalan was very secretive of Willis' involvement in Split, removing the final scene from the film for test audiences. The cameo was shown at the 2016 Fantastic Fest and 2016 AFI Fest months before its theatrical release.

As with The Visit, Shyamalan funded the film himself. Principal photography on the film began on November 11, 2015, in Philadelphia, Pennsylvania. Reshoots occurred in June 2016. During post-production, Sterling K. Brown's role as Shaw, Dr. Fletcher's neighbor, was cut from the film, as Shyamalan felt that his scenes were ultimately unnecessary. McAvoy broke his hand in a scene where he was supposed to punch a metal door, but missed the soft section of the door he intended to hit.

== Release ==
Split had its world premiere at Fantastic Fest on September 26, 2016. It also screened at the AFI Fest on November 15, 2016. The film was theatrically released on January 20, 2017, in the United States, United Kingdom and Canada. Split was released on Digital HD on April 4, 2017, and on Blu-ray, DVD, and On-Demand on April 18, 2017, by Universal Pictures Home Entertainment.

== Reception ==
=== Box office ===
Split grossed $138.3 million in the United States and Canada and $140.2 million in other territories, for a worldwide gross of $278.5 million, against a production budget of $9 million. Deadline Hollywood calculated the film made a net profit of $68.2 million, when factoring together all expenses and revenues. It had a gross profit of $105.1 million, with over 2,000% return on investment (ROI), making it the most profitable film of 2017.

In North America, the film was released alongside the openings of xXx: Return of Xander Cage, The Resurrection of Gavin Stone and The Founder, as well as the wide expansion of 20th Century Women, and was initially expected to gross $20–25 million from 3,038 theaters in its opening weekend. It made $2 million from its Thursday night previews at 2,295 theaters, doubling the $1 million made by Shyamalan's The Visit in 2015, and $14.6 million on its first day, increasing weekend estimates to $30–37 million; it ended up opening to $40.2 million, finishing first at the box office. In its second weekend, the film made $26.3 million, again topping the box office. In its third week, it again topped the box office, this time with $14.6 million, becoming the first Shyamalan film to finish at number one for three straight weeks since The Sixth Sense in 1999.

=== Critical response ===
On review aggregator Rotten Tomatoes, the film has an approval rating of 79% based on 313 reviews, with an average rating of 6.6/10. The website's critical consensus reads: "Split serves as a dramatic tour de force for James McAvoy in multiple roles – and finds writer-director M. Night Shyamalan returning resoundingly to thrilling form." Metacritic reports a weighted average score 63 out of 100, based on 48 critics, indicating "generally favorable reviews". Audiences polled by CinemaScore gave the film an average grade of "B+" on an A+ to F scale, while comScore reported filmgoers gave it a 78% overall positive score and a 54% "definite recommend".

Jordan Hoffman of The Guardian gave the film four stars out of five, stating it to be a "masterful blend of Hitchcock, horror and therapy session". Also writing for The Guardian, Steve Rose had strong praise for McAvoy, opining that the actor "does a fine and fearless job of selling his character's varied personae". He commended McAvoy's ability to switch personalities in one scene toward the end of the film, saying: "It's a little like the T-1000 at the end of Terminator 2. But there are no special effects here, just acting." Christy Lemire, writing for RogerEbert.com, gave the film a score of 3 out of 4 stars, describing it as "an exciting return to form" and "a thrilling reminder of what a technical master [Shyamalan] can be. All his virtuoso camerawork is on display: his lifelong, loving homage to Alfred Hitchcock, which includes, as always, inserting himself in a cameo. And the twist—that there is no Big Twist—is one of the most refreshing parts of all." Kate Muir of The Times gave the film a score of 3 stars out of 5, writing that it "is full of plot holes, but McAvoy's joyful and menacingly lunatic performance papers over most of them."

David Edelstein of New York magazine was critical of the film, writing: "Shyamalan has returned to what he loves to do: use cheap horror tropes to create his own harebrained mythos", and added: "Though Shyamalan doesn't use a lot of blood in Split — there's barely any — his framing sexualizes the torture of the other two teenage girls in a way I found reprehensible. And his depictions of childhood sexual abuse are clinically accurate enough to make anyone with experience of such things feel sick." Anthony Lane of The New Yorker described the film as "an old-fashioned exploitation flick—part of a depleted and degrading genre that not even M. Night Shyamalan, the writer and director of Split, can redeem."

Despite parallels to the Japanese Kaijin (literally "mysterious person") productions stretching back to at least the 1950s, some have proffered this film as allegedly the first supervillain origin story - the first film completely devoted to the origins of a villain as opposed to the origins of the superhero. In the academic environment, the film has been described as a speciesist dystopian vision of transhumanity that imposes the label of disability on fragmented human identities. It has also been described as Hollywood's first stealth sequel, with The Hollywood Reporter calling the ending reveal "one of the most shocking surprises in cinematic history".

=== Reaction from the mental health community ===
The film has been poorly received by mental illness and dissociative identity disorder campaigners. Mental health advocates warn that the film stigmatizes dissociative identity disorder and may directly affect those living with it. "You are going to upset and potentially exacerbate symptoms in thousands of people who are already suffering," psychiatrist Dr. Garrett Marie Deckel, a DID specialist at Mount Sinai's Icahn School of Medicine, said immediately after seeing the film. She said that, in contrast to McAvoy's character, people with DID, who may represent over 1% of Americans, are rarely violent, and research has shown they are far more likely to hurt themselves than to hurt others. Movies tend to portray only "the most extreme aspects" of the disorder, which, she said, can misrepresent a form of mental ill-health that is not well understood by the lay public, and even some psychiatrists.

In a statement about the movie, the International Society for the Study of Trauma and Dissociation (ISSTD) cited a soon-to-be-released study of 173 people with DID. The researchers found that only 3 percent were charged with an offense, 1.8 percent were fined, and less than 1 percent were in jail over a six-month span. No convictions or probations were reported in that time period. In an open letter to Shyamalan, several activists said that "Split represents yet another gross parody of us based on fear, ignorance, and sensationalism, only much worse."

=== Accolades ===
Award	Date of ceremony	Category	Recipient(s)	Result	Ref(s)
London Film Critics' Circle	January 22, 2017	Young British/Irish Performer of the Year	Anya Taylor-Joy (also for Morgan and The Witch)	Nominated	
MTV Movie & TV Awards	May 7, 2017	Best Actor in a Movie	James McAvoy	Nominated	
Saturn Awards	June 28, 2017	Best Thriller Film	Split	Nominated	
Saturn Awards	June 28, 2017	Best Supporting Actress	Betty Buckley	Nominated	
Teen Choice Awards	August 13, 2017	Choice Movie: Villain	James McAvoy	Nominated	
San Diego Film Critics Society	December 11, 2017	Best Actor	James McAvoy	Won	
Seattle Film Critics Society	December 18, 2017	Villain of the Year	James McAvoy	Won	
Casting Society of America	January 18, 2018	Studio or Independent – Drama	Douglas Aibel, Diane Heery, Jason Loftus, and Henry Russell Bergstein	Nominated	
Empire Awards	March 18, 2018	Best Horror	Split	Nominated	

== Sequel ==
Shyamalan expressed hope for a third installment following Split, saying, "I hope [a third Unbreakable film happens]. The answer is yes. I'm just such a wimp sometimes. I don't know what's going to happen when I go off in my room, a week after this film opens, to write the script. But I'm going to start writing. [I have] a really robust outline, which is pretty intricate. But now the standards for my outlines are higher. I need to know I've won already. I'm almost there but I'm not quite there." He explained that the final scene from Split was David's realization that Mr. Glass from the first film was right; there are superpowered people in the world. Disney, which produced Unbreakable through its Touchstone Pictures division, was expected to be a production partner and have financial participation with Universal for the sequel.

After the critical and financial success of Split, Shyamalan confirmed that his next film would be a sequel film that follows the events of Unbreakable and Split and would serve as the final part of the Unbreakable trilogy. In April 2017, he revealed he was nearing completion on the script for the next film. On April 26, he revealed on his Twitter page that the script was completed and the sequel would be titled Glass.

Following a week of rehearsals, principal production commenced on October 2, 2017, in Philadelphia.

The cast included the return of Bruce Willis from both previous films, Samuel L. Jackson, Spencer Treat Clark, and Charlayne Woodard from Unbreakable, and James McAvoy and Anya Taylor-Joy from Split, all reprising their roles. Sarah Paulson joined the cast as a new character. It was reported the new film would focus on Dunn (Willis) chasing down Crumb (McAvoy) in his Beast persona, all the while being embroiled in a plot orchestrated by Price (Jackson).

Glass was released on January 18, 2019.
