= San Diego Film Critics Society Award for Best Actor =

Annual US film award

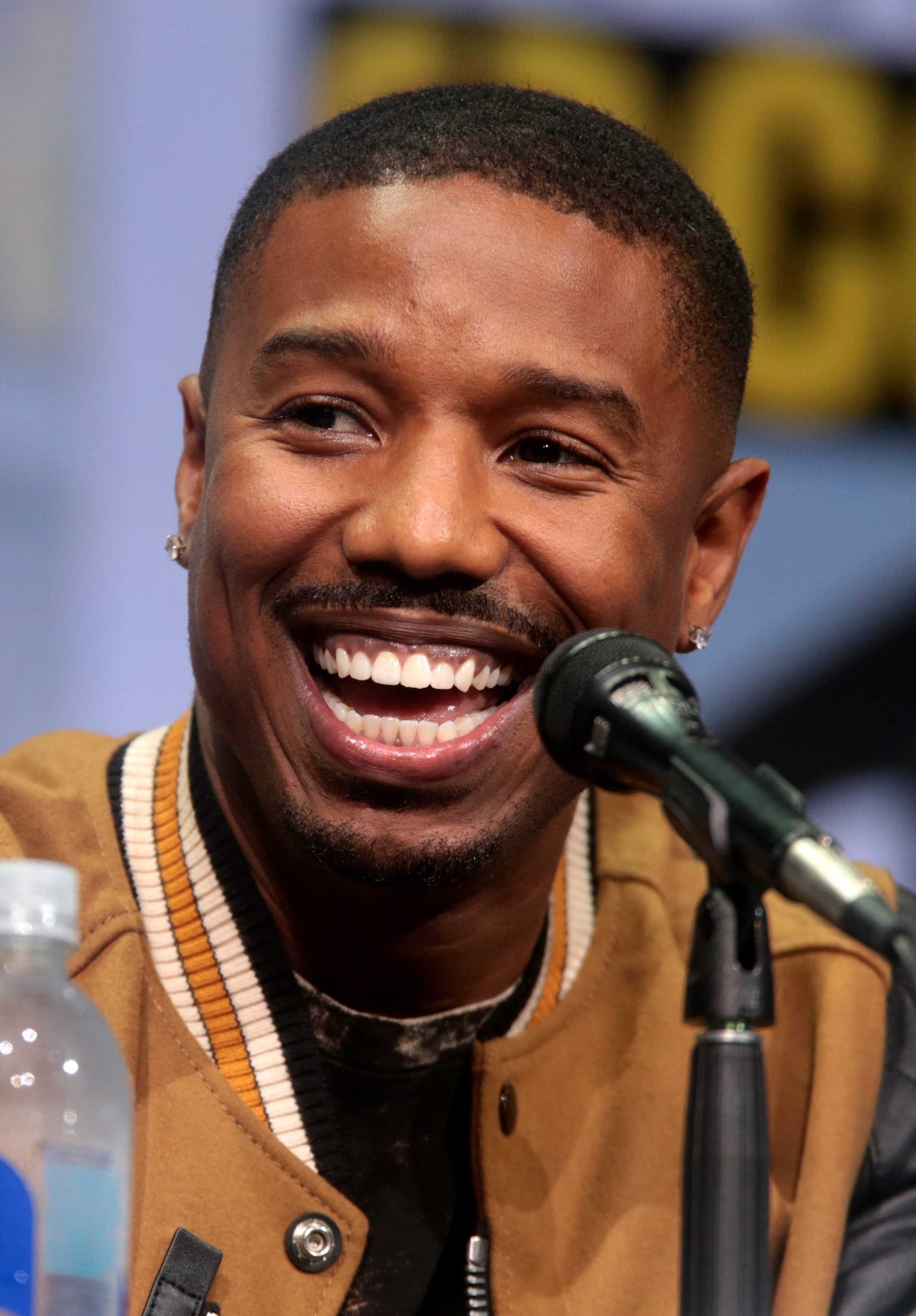
- Current recipient: Michael B. Jordan
- Awarded for: Best Performance by an Actor in a Leading Role
- Country: United States
- Presented by: San Diego Film Critics Society
- First award: 1996
- Currently held by: Michael B. Jordan; Sinners (2025)
- Website: sdfcs.org

The San Diego Film Critics Society Award for Best Actor is an award given by the San Diego Film Critics Society to honor the finest male acting achievements in film-making.

== Winners ==
=== 1990s ===
Year	Winner	Film	Role
1996	Kenneth Branagh	Hamlet	Hamlet
1997	Jack Nicholson	As Good as It Gets	Melvin Udall
1998	Ian McKellen	Gods and Monsters	James Whale
1999	Kevin Spacey	American Beauty	Lester Burnham

=== 2000s ===
Year	Winner	Film	Role
2000	Russell Crowe	Gladiator	Maximus Decimus Meridius
2001	Guy Pearce	Memento	Leonard
2002	Daniel Day-Lewis	Gangs of New York	William "Bill the Butcher" Cutting
2003	Chiwetel Ejiofor	Dirty Pretty Things	Okwe
2004	Jim Carrey	Eternal Sunshine of the Spotless Mind	Joel Barish
2005	Philip Seymour Hoffman	Capote	Truman Capote
2006	Ken Takakura	Riding Alone for Thousands of Miles (Qian li zou dan qi)	Gou-ichi Takata
2007	Daniel Day-Lewis	There Will Be Blood	Daniel Plainview
2008	Mickey Rourke	The Wrestler	Randy Robinson
2009	Colin Firth	A Single Man	George Falconer

=== 2010s ===
Year	Winner	Film	Role
2010	Colin Farrell	Ondine	Syracuse
2011	Michael Shannon	Take Shelter	Curtis LaForche
2012	Daniel Day-Lewis	Lincoln	Abraham Lincoln
2013	Oscar Isaac	Inside Llewyn Davis	Llewyn Davis
2014	Jake Gyllenhaal	Nightcrawler	Lou Bloom
2015	Leonardo DiCaprio	The Revenant	Hugh Glass
2016	Casey Affleck	Manchester by the Sea	Lee Chandler
2017	James McAvoy	Split	Kevin Wendell Crumb
2018	Ethan Hawke	First Reformed	Pastor Ernst Toller
2019	Adam Driver	Marriage Story	Charlie Barber
2019	Joaquin Phoenix	Joker	Arthur Fleck

=== 2020s ===
Year	Winner	Film	Role
2020	Riz Ahmed	Sound of Metal	Ruben Stone
2021	Nicolas Cage	Pig (2021 film)	Rob Feld
2022	Colin Farrell	The Banshees of Inisherin	Pádraic Súilleabháin
2023	Jeffrey Wright	American Fiction	Thelonious "Monk" Ellison
2024	Colman Domingo	Sing Sing	John "Divine G" Whitfield
2025	Michael B. Jordan	Sinners	Elijah "Smoke" Moore / Elias "Stack" Moore
