= Glass (2019 film) =

Film by M. Night Shyamalan

- Theatrical release poster
- Directed by: M. Night Shyamalan
- Written by: M. Night Shyamalan
- Produced by: M. Night Shyamalan; Jason Blum; Marc Bienstock; Ashwin Rajan
- Starring: James McAvoy; Bruce Willis; Anya Taylor-Joy; Sarah Paulson; Samuel L. Jackson
- Cinematography: Mike Gioulakis
- Edited by: Luke Ciarrocchi; Blu Murray
- Music by: West Dylan Thordson
- Production companies: Perfect World Pictures; Blinding Edge Pictures; Blumhouse Productions
- Distributed by: Universal Pictures (United States and Canada); Buena Vista International (International)
- Release dates: January 12, 2019 (Alamo Drafthouse Cinema); January 18, 2019 (United States)
- Running time: 129 minutes
- Country: United States
- Language: English
- Budget: $20 million
- Box office: $247 million

Glass is a 2019 American superhero thriller film written and directed by M. Night Shyamalan. It is a crossover and sequel to Shyamalan's previous films Unbreakable (2000) and Split (2016) and the final installment of the Unbreakable trilogy. Bruce Willis, Samuel L. Jackson, Spencer Treat Clark, and Charlayne Woodard reprise their Unbreakable roles, while James McAvoy and Anya Taylor-Joy return as their Split characters, with Sarah Paulson, Adam David Thompson, and Luke Kirby joining the cast. The film sees David Dunn / the Overseer as he and Kevin Wendell Crumb / the Horde are captured and placed in a psychiatric facility with Elijah Price / Mr. Glass, where they contemplate the authenticity of their superhuman powers.

After the Walt Disney Studios' Touchstone Pictures opted not to finance a sequel to Unbreakable, Shyamalan set out to write Split using a character he had written for Unbreakable but pulled from its script. He decided to create a trilogy of works, using the ending of Split to merge Glass with the Unbreakable narrative. To secure the rights to use Willis' and Jackson's Unbreakable characters, Shyamalan promised to include Disney in the film along with Universal Pictures. Split was a financial and critical success, and by April 2017 Shyamalan announced that he started the production process for Glass.

Glass had its world premiere in select Alamo Drafthouse Cinema theaters on January 12, 2019, and was released in the United States on January 18 by Universal Pictures. The film received mixed reviews from critics, who found the film "disappointing" and "underwhelming" due to the story, particularly the third act, but praised the performances of the cast; many deemed it the weakest in the trilogy. The film was a financial success, grossing $247 million worldwide against a $20 million production budget.

== Plot ==
Superhuman David Dunn, now a superhero dubbed the Overseer, and his son Joseph track Kevin Wendell Crumb, a man with multiple personalities called The Horde, to an abandoned factory near Philadelphia. Kevin holds four cheerleaders hostage to feed The Beast, a superhuman personality that several of Kevin's personalities worship. David rescues the cheerleaders and has a scuffle with The Beast until they are both captured by Dr. Ellie Staple. They are taken to the Raven Hill Memorial Psychiatric Hospital, where a sedated Elijah "Mr. Glass" Price, a former terrorist born with osteogenesis imperfecta, whom David previously fought over a decade ago, (Note: As depicted in Unbreakable (2000)) is being detained.

David and Kevin are placed in separate rooms containing unique security measures based on their weaknesses of water and light flashes, respectively. Ellie diagnoses them as suffering from delusions of grandeur and believes they do not have superpowers. Elijah's mother Mrs. Price, Joseph, and Beast survivor Casey Cooke (Note: as depicted in Split (2016)) individually fail to convince Ellie that superhumans are real and to let them go. As part of her final evaluation, Ellie brings the trio to a room where she challenges them with explanations backing up her theory. David and several of Kevin's personalities become confused and distraught, while Elijah remains catatonic.

That night, Elijah awakens, escapes from his room, and conducts research on David and Kevin. He visits Kevin and says he has been feigning his sedated state and plans to escape the institute, but he requires the help of The Beast to do so. The next morning, Ellie sees surveillance footage of Elijah outside his room and performs a prefrontal lobotomy-type procedure on him. When he is alone with his caretaker, Elijah kills the man, revealing the procedure was unsuccessful because he had sabotaged the surgical laser. He frees Kevin and then manipulates David into using his strength to break out of his room by relaying a master plan for The Beast to reveal himself to the world at the opening of the Osaka Tower, a new skyscraper in Philadelphia, while Elijah destroys a chemical lab in the building, potentially killing thousands.

Mrs. Price, Casey, and Joseph arrive at Raven Hill just as Elijah, Kevin, and David escape. Ellie, also witnessing the fight, calls an armed SWAT team to move in on the superhumans. David and The Beast battle at the Raven Hill parking lot, before Elijah tells The Beast that David's weakness is water, at which point Joseph reveals that Kevin's father died in the train wreck that Elijah caused. The Beast thanks Elijah for contributing to his creation by making it so that Kevin was raised solely by his abusive mother, before mortally wounding Elijah for manipulating the situation that led to Kevin's abuse. He throws David into a water storage tank, but David is able to break through the side, drenching the surrounding area. Casey manages to bring out Kevin's dormant original personality, at which point a sniper fatally shoots him, and Kevin dies in Casey's arms. While SWAT officers drown David in a flooded pothole, Ellie reveals she is part of a clandestine organization that has been suppressing the existence of superhumans for millennia by tracking and killing them.

In the aftermath, Ellie deletes the surveillance footage of the confrontation and makes plans to move on to investigate the next case of suspected superhumans. However, when she overhears a group of comic book readers discussing the tropes of a super-genius mastermind, she realizes Elijah must have had a secret plan and discovers he arranged for the Raven Hill surveillance footage of the fight to be live-streamed to a private website, leaving her and her organization defeated. Mrs. Price, Joseph, and Casey each receive a copy of the footage and release it to the public, exposing the existence of superhumans.

== Cast ==
- James McAvoy as Kevin Wendell Crumb / the Horde: A former Philadelphia Zoo employee with 24 different personalities whose body chemistry changes with each personality, including a personality known as "The Beast"—a sadistic superhuman cannibal whose abilities include wall-crawling and enhanced strength, speed, durability, and agility.
  - Owen Vitullo portrays an 8-year-old Kevin.
- Bruce Willis as David Dunn / the Overseer: A superhuman vigilante with enhanced strength and durability, as well as the ability to see the crimes people have committed if he touches them. In the film, Dunn goes by a new alias, "the Overseer".
  - Colin Becker portrays a 10-year-old David.
- Samuel L. Jackson as Elijah Price / Mr. Glass: A comic book theorist, genius level intellect and mass murderer who is confined to a wheelchair due to his Type I osteogenesis imperfecta. Elijah was institutionalized after Dunn discovered his crimes.
  - William Turner portrays a young Elijah
  - Johnny Hiram Jamison plays a 14-year-old Elijah (via photographs).
- Sarah Paulson as Dr. Ellie Staple: A psychiatrist specializing in delusions of grandeur who treats patients convinced they are superhuman beings and attempts to prove Dunn, Price and Crumb are not superhumans.
- Anya Taylor-Joy as Casey Cooke: A 17-year-old girl with a history of abuse who was kidnapped by one of Kevin's identities as a potential sacrifice to "The Beast", but managed to survive. She is the only person capable of bringing forth Kevin's dormant original/"host" personality.
- Spencer Treat Clark as Joseph Dunn: David's son, who has believed in his father's abilities since he was a child and sees him as a real-life superhero.
- Charlayne Woodard as Mrs. Price: Elijah's mother, who took great care of her son and always told him he was special, no matter what others said.
- Luke Kirby as Pierce: One of Elijah's caretakers at Raven Hill.
- Adam David Thompson as Daryl: An employee at Raven Hill.

M. Night Shyamalan reprises his cameo role of Jai, the security guard at Dr. Fletcher's apartment building, from Split, who recognizes David Dunn and asks him if he used to work at the football stadium, indicating that Jai was the drug dealer David confronted at the stadium in Unbreakable (a part also played by Shyamalan). Shannon Destiny Ryan, Diana Silvers, Nina Wisner, and Kyli Zion portrayed the kidnapped cheerleaders at the start of the film. Rosemary Howard and Bryan McElroy portrayed Kevin's parents, Penelope and Clarence, with Howard reprising her role from Split.

== Production ==
=== Development ===
After the release of M. Night Shyamalan's Unbreakable (2000), rumors of possible sequels began circulating in different interviews and on film fansites. At the time, Bruce Willis, who played David Dunn / the Overseer, was quoted as saying he hoped there would be an Unbreakable trilogy, but, in December 2000, Shyamalan denied rumors he had written Unbreakable as the first installment of a trilogy. In August 2001, he stated that, because of successful DVD sales, he had approached Touchstone Pictures about an Unbreakable sequel, but the studio originally declined because of the film's disappointing box office performance.

In September 2008, Shyamalan and star Samuel L. Jackson, who played Elijah Price / Mr. Glass, stated discussions about making a sequel had been largely abandoned in light of the disappointing box office returns. Jackson indicated he was still interested in a sequel, but Shyamalan remained noncommittal. In February 2010, Willis said Shyamalan was "still thinking about doing the fight movie between me and Sam" and stated that, as long as Jackson was able to participate, he would be "up for it".

Shyamalan worked on various unrelated films after Unbreakable before releasing Split (2016), which introduces the split-personality character Kevin Wendell Crumb / the Horde, played by James McAvoy. Crumb had been included in the initial script of Unbreakable, but Shyamalan felt the character created balancing issues and removed him from the story (Shyamalan has said "a bunch" of the scenes in Split were originally written for Unbreakable). In the final scene of Split, Willis' Dunn is seen learning about the escape of The Horde and thereby realizing that other superhumans exist, as predicted by Jackson's Mr. Glass. Unbreakable was produced and owned by Touchstone Pictures, a label of the Walt Disney Studios, while Split was produced through Universal Pictures, so Shyamalan had to obtain permission from Disney to use the character of Dunn in Split. He met with Walt Disney Studios president Sean Bailey and came to a gentlemen's agreement, whereby Bailey agreed to allow the use of the character in the film without a fee, and Shyamalan promised that Disney would be involved in a sequel, if it was developed.

Split was met with critical and financial success. In January 2017, Shyamalan stated that, although he hoped a third Unbreakable film would be made and he already had an outline prepared, "I don't know what's going to happen when I go off in my room, a week after this film opens, to write the script." The next month, he affirmed his next film would be the third work in the trilogy. He finished the script by April, at which point he announced the new film would be called Glass and have a target release date of January 18, 2019. Universal was selected to distribute the film in the United States, while Disney distributed the film internationally through its Buena Vista International label.

Shyamalan has been asked numerous times if there will be a sequel to Glass. In January 2019, he officially confirmed that no sequels are currently planned, adding that he has no interest in building a cinematic universe.

In an interview with Fangoria in January 2023, Shyamalan officially confirmed he had plans to tie The Visit (2015) into the trilogy, with the reference planned to be in the scene where David, Kevin, and Elijah are going through Raven Hill Memorial Psychiatric Hospital, wherein staff members would have casually mentioned the infamous incident of two elderly patients escaping from the asylum years prior (referencing Claire and Mitchell, the imposters posing as staffers Marja Bella Jamison and Frederick Spencer Jamison respectively after they killed them and stole their identities to become the "Nana" and "Pop-Pop" that terrorized Becca and Tyler Jamison in The Visit, revealing they escaped from Raven Hill). Shyamalan stated "If I was smart enough to have thought about it 20 some years ago, I would’ve done it, but I wasn’t smart enough to think about it. There was one tie-in that I almost did. It was in Glass when they all got to the mental institution. I was going to tell a story about The Visit and how two people escaped from that same hospital... I was going to do it, but I chickened out. So I didn’t do it.".

=== Casting ===
The cast of Glass includes returning actors from each of the previous films in the trilogy (Willis, Jackson, Spencer Treat Clark, and Charlayne Woodard all reprise their respective roles from Unbreakable, and McAvoy and Anya Taylor-Joy reprise their roles from Split), while Sarah Paulson plays a new character. In November 2017, Adam David Thompson joined the cast in a then-undisclosed role.

=== Filming ===
As with The Visit and Split, Shyamalan funded the film himself. Principal photography began on October 2, 2017, in Philadelphia, following a week of rehearsals, with plans for a thirty-nine-day shoot. On October 31, it was reported that Shyamalan would be filming at Allentown State Hospital in Allentown for a few weeks. On December 12, Shyamalan revealed that four scenes would be shot in January 2018, stating he would have to travel for their filming.

Willis reportedly seemed confused and needed help with his lines during filming, something later believed to be an early sign of the aphasia that led the actor to retire from filming in 2021.

=== Post-production ===
Deleted footage from Unbreakable was edited into the film as flashbacks to Elijah and Joseph's childhood.

== Music ==
West Dylan Thordson returned to score the film after his collaboration with Shyamalan on Split. He used themes from James Newton Howard's score for Unbreakable, as well as from his own score for Split, in composing the music for Glass. The score is distributed digitally by Back Lot Music.

== Release ==
=== Marketing ===
On April 25, 2018, the film was featured at CinemaCon, with Shyamalan in attendance. He presented footage from the film, along with the first official image featuring Willis, Jackson, and McAvoy in character. He also expressed his intention for the film, saying, "The worlds of Unbreakable and Split finally collide in Glass. What if these real life superheroes and super-villains are somehow locked up together? What could go wrong?" Despite being preceded by hyper-realistic films about superheroes and villains, such as The Dark Knight (2008), Shyamalan personally considered Glass to be the "first truly grounded comic book movie".

On July 12, the first official photographs from production were released publicly, including shots of Samuel L. Jackson, Sarah Paulson, and James McAvoy. A week later, the film was promoted at San Diego Comic-Con, with Shyamalan, Willis, Jackson, Taylor-Joy, and Paulson attending a panel where the film's first trailer premiered. The studio spent a total of $80 million promoting the film.

=== Theatrical ===
The first screenings of Glass occurred on January 12, 2019, at 25 Alamo Drafthouse Cinema locations, where it played during a triple-feature event that included and was preceded by Unbreakable and Split. It was theatrically released on January 18, in the United States and Canada by Universal Pictures, and in international territories by Walt Disney Studios Motion Pictures through their sub-division Buena Vista International.

=== Home media ===
The film was released by Universal Pictures Home Entertainment in the U.S., and Walt Disney Studios Home Entertainment through Buena Vista Home Entertainment internationally, on digital on April 2, 2019, and on DVD, Blu-ray, and Ultra HD Blu-ray on April 16.

== Reception ==
=== Box office ===
Glass grossed $111 million in the United States and Canada and $135.9 million in other territories, for a total worldwide gross of $247 million, against a production budget of $20 million. Deadline Hollywood calculated the film made a net profit of $68 million when factoring together all expenses and revenues.

In the United States and Canada, the film was projected to make $50–75 million from 3,841 theaters over its four-day MLK Day opening weekend. It made $15.9 million on its first day, including $3.7 million from Thursday night previews, and went on to gross $40.3 million in its opening weekend and $46.5 million over the four days, marking the third-best total for Martin Luther King Jr. weekend (behind American Sniper and Ride Along) and of Shyamalan's career. In its second weekend, the film fell 53% to $18.9 million (a steeper drop than Split's 35%), but it retained the top spot at the box office. The film again finished its third weekend on top, grossing $9.5 million, before finally being dethroned in its fourth weekend, when it finished fifth with a gross of $6.3 million.

Internationally, the film was expected to gross $45–50 million in its first weekend, for a total of global opening of $105–120 million. It ended up making $48.5 million from international markets, with a global opening of $89.1 million. It finished first in most markets; its highest-grossing countries were Russia ($5.2 million), Mexico ($4.5 million, the best-ever for a Shyamalan film), the United Kingdom ($4.3 million), France ($3.4 million), and South Korea ($2.8 million).

=== Critical response ===
On review aggregator Rotten Tomatoes, the film holds an approval rating of 37% based on 412 reviews, with an average rating of 5.2/10. The website's critical consensus reads: "Glass displays a few glimmers of M. Night Shyamalan at his twisty world-building best, but ultimately disappoints as the conclusion to the writer-director's long-gestating trilogy." On Metacritic, the film has a weighted average score of 43 out of 100, based on 53 critics, indicating "mixed or average" reviews. Audiences polled by CinemaScore gave the film an average grade of "B" on an A+ to F scale, down from Split's "B+", but up from Unbreakable's "C", while those at PostTrak gave it an overall positive score of 70% and a "definite recommend" of 49%.

David Ehrlich of IndieWire gave the film a "C−" and called it the biggest disappointment of Shyamalan's career: "The trouble with Glass isn't that its creator sees his own reflection at every turn, or that he goes so far out of his way to contort the film into a clear parable for the many stages of his turbulent career; the trouble with Glass is that its mildly intriguing meta-textual narrative is so much richer and more compelling than the asinine story that Shyamalan tells on its surface." Writing for Rolling Stone, David Fear gave the film three out of five stars: "Glass is not the flaming flop some folks have already suggested it is, nor is it the movie you want in terms of tying ambitious, highfalutin' notions together about how we process our pulp mythos. In a world in which all movies are now either genocide or ice cream, it's a grand gesture characterized by a sense of ambivalence about what you've just seen – which may in and of itself be a sign of failure".

Owen Gleiberman of Variety wrote: "It's good to see Shyamalan back (to a degree) in form, to the extent that he's recovered his basic mojo as a yarn spinner. But Glass occupies us without haunting us; it's more busy than it is stirring or exciting. Maybe that's because revisiting this material feels a touch opportunistic, and maybe it's because the deluge of comic-book movies that now threatens to engulf us on a daily basis has leeched what's left of the mystery out of comics." Richard Roeper of the Chicago Sun-Times said the film had "a distinctive look and some pretty cool moments, and a half-decent twist or two" but that it was mostly "an underwhelming, half-baked, slightly sour, and even off-putting finale." John DeFore of The Hollywood Reporter thought it was "a mixed bag" as a trilogy-closer, saying it does a good job of tying the narrative strands together, but that it tries too hard and fails to provide "something uniquely brainy" to the superhero genre. Joshua Rivera of GQ magazine stated: "The timeline is barely comprehensible, with twists so openly telegraphed they'd have saved the Titanic."

David Sims of The Atlantic compared the film to Batman Returns (1992) and Incredibles 2 (2018): "I appreciate the sheer brashness of Shyamalan's storytelling, which swirls the mythmaking inherent in characters such as David with the emotional scars borne by orphaned characters such as Superman." The cast were praised, in particular McAvoy, who "once again [was] top notch" and "lit up the screen with his eerie physicality every time he appears."

Later, Shyamalan admitted that he cried at the negative reviews for Glass:

"Honestly, I was feeling like, 'Will they never let me be different without throwing me on the garbage pile? The feeling of worthlessness rushed me, and to be honest, it doesn’t ever really leave. But anyway, the film went on, right? It became number one in every country in the world, and it represents my beliefs".

=== Accolades ===
Accolades received by Glass (2019 film)
Award	Date of ceremony	Category	Recipient(s)	Result	Ref.
Golden Raspberry Awards	March 16, 2020	Worst Supporting Actor	Bruce Willis	Nominated	
Golden Trailer Awards	May 29, 2019	Best Thriller Poster	Glass (Lindeman & Associates)	Won	
Golden Trailer Awards	May 29, 2019	Best Motion Poster	"Motion Posters" (Lindeman & Associates)	Nominated	
Golden Trailer Awards	May 29, 2019	Most Original Poster	"Cracked" (Lindeman & Associates)	Nominated	
National Film & TV Awards	December 3, 2019	Best Actor	James McAvoy	Nominated	
People's Choice Awards	November 10, 2019	Favorite Drama Movie	Glass	Nominated	
People's Choice Awards	November 10, 2019	Favorite Drama Movie Star	Samuel L. Jackson	Nominated	
People's Choice Awards	November 10, 2019	Favorite Drama Movie Star	Sarah Paulson	Nominated	
Saturn Awards	September 13, 2019	Best Action or Adventure Film	Glass	Nominated	
