= Unbreakable (film) =

2000 film by M. Night Shyamalan

- Theatrical release poster
- Directed by: M. Night Shyamalan
- Written by: M. Night Shyamalan
- Produced by: Barry Mendel; Sam Mercer; M. Night Shyamalan
- Starring: Bruce Willis; Samuel L. Jackson; Robin Wright
- Cinematography: Eduardo Serra
- Edited by: Dylan Tichenor
- Music by: James Newton Howard
- Production companies: Touchstone Pictures; Blinding Edge Pictures; Barry Mendel Productions; Limited Edition Productions Inc.
- Distributed by: Buena Vista Pictures Distribution
- Release dates: November 3, 2000 (New York City); November 22, 2000 (United States)
- Running time: 107 minutes
- Country: United States
- Language: English
- Budget: $75 million
- Box office: $248.1 million

Unbreakable is a 2000 American superhero thriller film written, produced, and directed by M. Night Shyamalan, and starring Bruce Willis, Samuel L. Jackson, and Robin Wright. In Unbreakable, David Dunn (Willis) survives a train crash with no injuries, leading to the realization that he harbors superhuman abilities. As he begins to grapple with this discovery, he comes to the attention of disabled comic book store owner Elijah Price (Jackson), who manipulates David to understand him.

Shyamalan organized the narrative of Unbreakable to parallel a comic book's traditional three-part story structure. After settling on the origin story, Shyamalan wrote the screenplay as a speculative screenplay with Willis already set to star in the film and Jackson in mind to portray Elijah Price. Filming began in April 2000 and was completed in July.

Unbreakable was released by Buena Vista Pictures Distribution on November 22, 2000. It received generally positive reviews, with praise for Shyamalan's direction, screenplay, its aesthetics, the performances, the emotional weight of the story, cinematography, and the score by James Newton Howard. The film has subsequently gained a strong cult following. A realistic vision of the superhero genre, it is regarded by many as one of Shyamalan's best films and one of the best superhero films. In 2011, Time listed it as one of the top ten superhero films of all time, ranking it number four. Quentin Tarantino also included it on his list of the top 20 films released from 1992 to 2009.

After years of development on a follow-up film, a thematic sequel, Split, with Willis reprising his role as David Dunn in a cameo role, was released in January 2017. After the financial and critical success of Split, Shyamalan immediately began working on a third film, titled Glass, which was released January 18, 2019, thus making Unbreakable the first installment in the Unbreakable film series.

== Plot ==
In 1961 Philadelphia, baby Elijah Price is born with both arms and legs broken, caused by Type I osteogenesis imperfecta, a rare disease that renders his bones extremely fragile and prone to fracture.

In the present day, unhappily married former star quarterback and security guard David Dunn is returning home to Philadelphia after a job interview in New York when his train, Eastrail 177, suddenly speeds up. He wakes up in a hospital room, unscathed, and the doctors inform him he is the sole survivor of the derailment that killed all 131 other passengers. After attending a memorial service for the victims, David finds a note on his car asking how long it has been since he has been ill and inviting him to "Limited Edition", an art gallery operated by the now-adult Elijah Price. He goes with his son Joseph to meet Elijah. Elijah explains his theory of real-life superheroes: that if he represents extreme frailty, there must be someone "unbreakable" at the opposite extreme. David is unsettled and leaves, but later finds he can bench press 350 pounds well above his expectations. Joseph idolizes his father, believing him to be a superhero, although David maintains that he is ordinary.

David challenges Elijah's theory with a childhood incident when he almost drowned and contracted pneumonia. Elijah suggests that this highlights the common convention where superheroes have a weakness, contending that David's is water. David recalls the car accident in which he was unharmed and ripped off the car door with his bare hands to rescue his then-girlfriend/now-wife, Audrey. He feigned injury from the crash to quit football because Audrey hated the violence of the sport.

Under Elijah's guidance, David realizes that his intuition for picking out dangerous people in his work as a security guard is actually extrasensory perception. Consciously honing this ability, David discovers that touch contact with people brings him visions of criminal acts they have committed. As people bump into him in a crowd, he senses the crimes they have perpetrated such as theft, assault, and rape. He finds one he can act on: a sadistic janitor who has invaded a family home, killed the father, and is now holding the mother and two children captive. David follows the janitor to the victims' house and frees the children. The janitor pushes him into a pool, where he nearly drowns before being rescued by the children. David strangles the janitor to death, but finds the janitor has killed the mother. He returns home with a renewed sense of purpose and rekindles his relationship with Audrey. The following day, David shows Joseph a newspaper article featuring a sketch of the anonymous hero, whom Joseph recognizes as his father, and tearfully promises to keep his secret.

David meets Elijah's elderly mother, who explains the difference between villains who fight heroes with physical strength and those who use their intelligence. Pleased that his theory was correct, Elijah asks David to shake his hand; David senses from the contact that Elijah was responsible for numerous high-profile "accidents," including David's train crash, to find his superhero rival. Elijah tells David, "Now that we know who you are, I know who I am". He adopts his childhood nickname, "Mr. Glass," as his supervillain moniker. Text onscreen states that David reports Elijah's crimes to the police, and Elijah is confined to a psychiatric hospital for the criminally insane.

== Cast ==
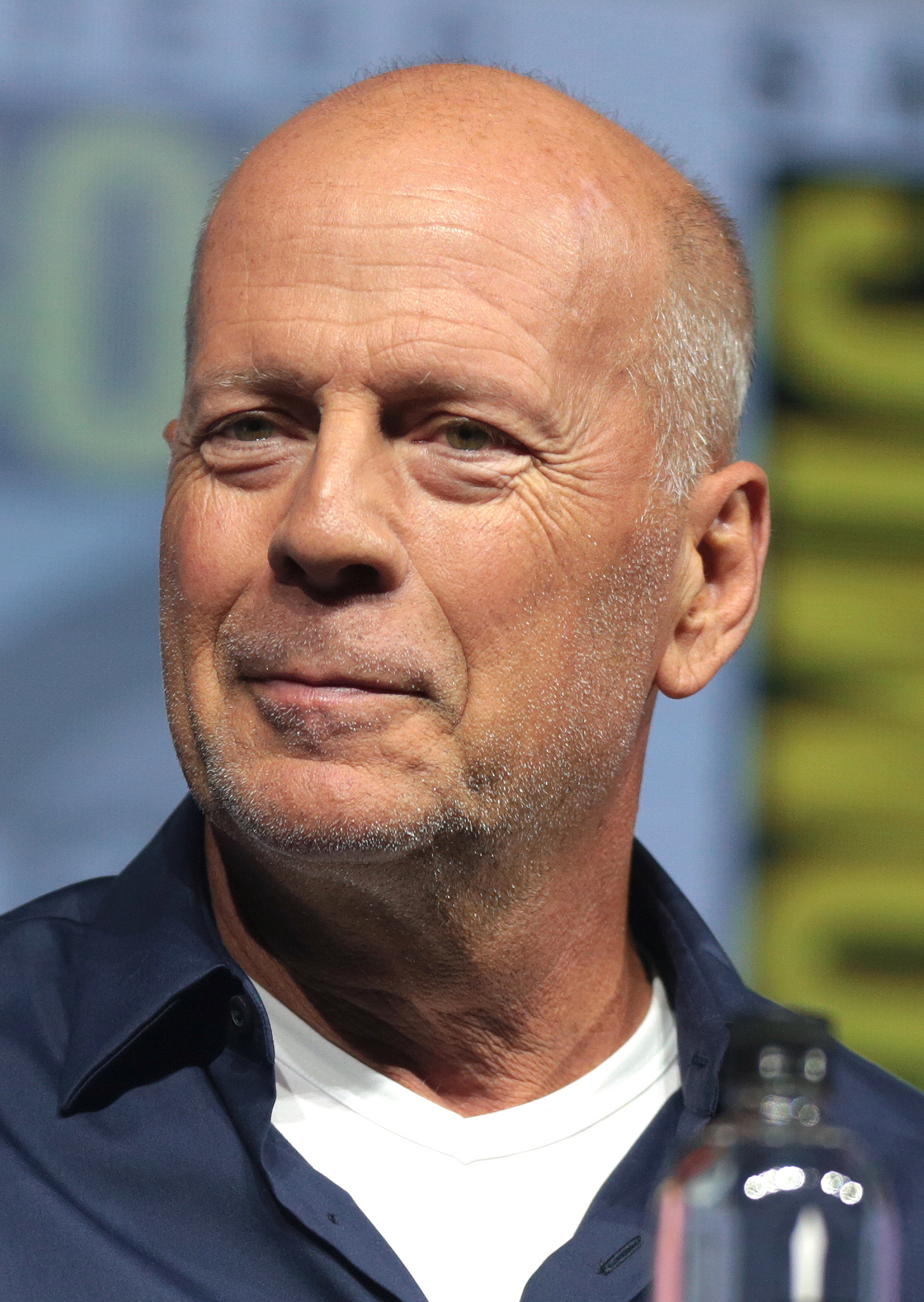
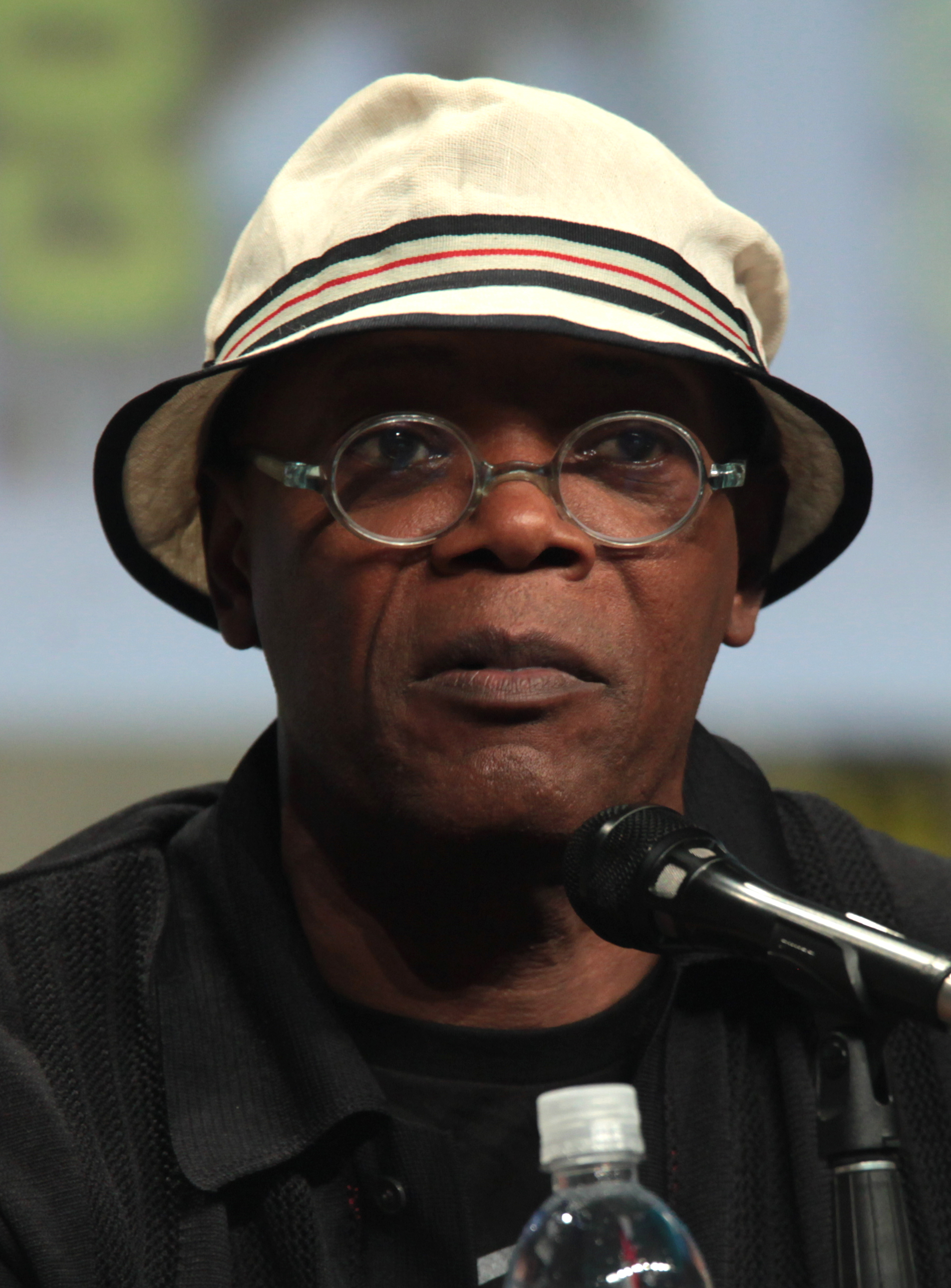
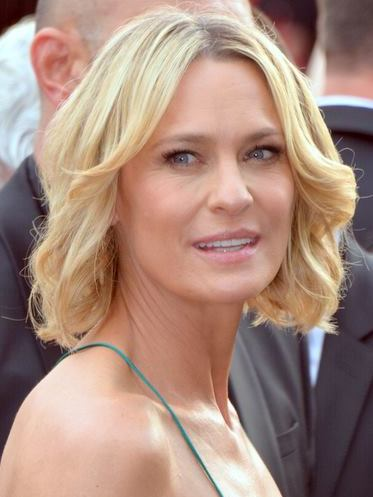
(Left to right) Bruce Willis (pictured in 2018), Samuel L. Jackson (2014), and Robin Wright (2017)
- Bruce Willis as David Dunn, a former football player with superhuman strength and invulnerability who sees the crimes of those whom he touches
  - Davis Duffield as 20-year-old David
- Samuel L. Jackson as Elijah Price/Mr. Glass, a comic book theorist, and deranged domestic terrorist with brittle bone disease
  - Johnny Hiram Jamison as 13-year-old Elijah
- Robin Wright as Audrey Dunn, David's wife and a physical therapist
  - Laura Regan as 20-year-old Audrey
- Spencer Treat Clark as Joseph Dunn, David's son who believes his father is a superhero
- Charlayne Woodard as Mrs. Price, Elijah's mother
- Eamonn Walker as Dr. Mathison
- Leslie Stefanson as Kelly
- Bostin Christopher as Comic Book Clerk
- Elizabeth Lawrence as School Nurse
- James Handy as Priest
- Chance Kelly as Orange Suit Man
- Michael Kelly as Dr. Dubin
- Joey Hazinsky as Five-Year-Old Boy/Kevin Wendell Crumb
- Dianne Cotten Murphy as Woman Walking By/Penelope Crumb

Writer, director, and producer M. Night Shyamalan makes an appearance as Stadium Drug Dealer. He reprises this role in the films Split and Glass, which both credit him as surveillance security guard Jai, who, in Glass, jokingly says he used to do shady stuff in the stadium back in his youth.

In October 2018, Shyamalan confirmed a fan theory that "Five-Year-Old Boy" and "Woman Walking By", who bump into David Dunn outside a stadium, are younger versions of Kevin Wendell Crumb and Penelope Crumb from Split, confirmed in the 2019 film Glass.

== Production ==
When M. Night Shyamalan conceived the idea for Unbreakable, the outline had a comic book's traditional three-part structure (the superhero's "birth", his struggles against general evil-doers, and the hero's ultimate battle against the "archenemy"). Finding the birth section most interesting, he decided to write Unbreakable as an origin story. During the filming of The Sixth Sense, Shyamalan had already approached Bruce Willis for the lead role of David Dunn. With Willis and Samuel L. Jackson specifically in mind for the two leading characters, Shyamalan began to write Unbreakable as a spec script during post-production on The Sixth Sense. Jackson recalled meeting Willis in a casino in Casablanca while he was on vacation prior to Unbreakable's production; Willis told Jackson that he had just finished filming for Shyamalan's The Sixth Sense and told Jackson about the new script that was written for both of them.

With the financial and critical success of The Sixth Sense in August 1999, Shyamalan gave Walt Disney Studios a first-look deal for Unbreakable. In return, Disney purchased Shyamalan's screenplay at a "spec script record" for $5 million. He was also given another $5 million to direct. Disney decided to release Unbreakable under their Touchstone Pictures banner. It also helped Shyamalan establish his own production company, Blinding Edge Pictures. Julianne Moore was cast as Audrey, David's wife, in January 2000, but dropped out in March 2000, to take on the role of Clarice Starling in Hannibal. Robin Wright was cast in her place. Principal photography began on April 25, 2000, and ended that July. The majority of filming took place in Philadelphia, Pennsylvania, the film's setting.

Shyamalan and cinematographer Eduardo Serra chose several camera angles to simulate the look of a comic book panel. Various visual narrative motifs were also applied. Several scenes relating to the Mr. Glass character involve glass. As a newborn, he is primarily seen reflected in mirrors, and as a young child, he is seen reflected in a blank TV screen. When he leaves his calling card on the windshield of David Dunn's car, he is reflected in a glass frame in his art gallery. Jackson requested his walking stick be made of glass to make his character more menacing. Using purple as Mr. Glass's color to David Dunn's green was also Jackson's idea. Mr. Glass's wig was modeled after Afro-American statesman Frederick Douglass.

Shyamalan said that he wanted to market Unbreakable as a comic book movie, but Disney—which had not yet bought Marvel Comics—preferred to advertise it as a supernatural thriller like The Sixth Sense. More than 15 minutes of footage was deleted during post-production of Unbreakable. These scenes are available on the DVD release.

== Soundtrack ==
James Newton Howard was approached by Shyamalan to work on Unbreakable immediately after scoring The Sixth Sense. It was recorded at AIR Studios Lyndhurst Hall, a converted church in London.

== Comic book references ==
Good cannot exist without evil and evil cannot exist without good.
— M. Night Shyamalan describing the film's use of superhero archetypes

Filmmaker and comic book writer Kevin Smith felt Unbreakable was briefly similar to a comic book titled Mage: The Hero Discovered, written and illustrated by Matt Wagner.

As in comic books, the main characters have their identified color schemes and aliases. David's are green and "Security" or "Hero", while Elijah's are purple and "Mr. Glass". The colors show up in their clothes, the wallpaper and bed sheets in their houses, Elijah's note to David, and various personal items. The people whose bad deeds are sensed by David are identified by an article of clothing in a single bright color (red, orange), to contrast them with the dark and dreary color scheme typical of the rest of the movie (but not of most comic books). Several scenes also depict characters through reflections or doorways, as if framing them in a picture similar to comic books.

== Reception ==
=== Box office ===
Unbreakable was released in the United States on November 22, 2000, in 2,708 theaters and grossed $30.3 million in its opening weekend, finishing second at the box office behind How the Grinch Stole Christmas. The film ended up earning $95 million domestically and $153.1 million internationally for a total of $248.1 million, against its $75 million production budget.

=== Critical response ===
Unbreakable received generally positive reviews from critics. On Rotten Tomatoes, the film has an approval rating of 70% based on 172 reviews, with an average rating of 6.3/10. The website's critical consensus states, "With a weaker ending, Unbreakable is not as good as The Sixth Sense. However, it is a quietly suspenseful film that intrigues and engages, taking the audience through unpredictable twists and turns along the way." On Metacritic, the film has a score of 62 out of 100, based on 31 critics, indicating "generally favorable reviews". Audiences polled by CinemaScore gave the film an average grade of "C" on an A+ to F scale.

Roger Ebert of Chicago Sun-Times, gave Unbreakable 3 out of 4 stars and had largely enjoyed the film, but was disappointed with the ending. Ebert believed that Willis's "subtle acting" was positively different from the actor's usual work in "brainless action movies". Richard Corliss of Time opined that Unbreakable continued Shyamalan's previous approach of "balancing sophistication and horror in all of his movies". Desson Thomson from The Washington Post wrote that "just as he did in The Sixth Sense, writer-director M. Night Shyamalan leads you into a fascinating labyrinth, an alternative universe that lurks right under our noses. In this case, it's the mythological world and, in these modern times, the secret design to that labyrinth, the key to the path, is contained in comic books."

Kenneth Turan, writing for the Los Angeles Times, gave a negative review, arguing that Unbreakable had no originality. "Whether it means to or not, the shadow of The Sixth Sense hangs over Unbreakable," Turan reasoned. "If The Sixth Sense hadn't been as big a success as it was, this story might have been assigned to oblivion, or at least to rewrite." Todd McCarthy of Variety mostly criticized Shyamalan's writing and the performances given by the actors. He did praise Dylan Tichenor's editing and James Newton Howard's music composition.

In 2002, Audrey Colombe described the movie's plot as an example of what "Toni Morrison calls a 'dehistoricizing allegory,'" with the Elijah Price character as yet another example of "White Hollywood"'s "magical African American male character" helping the white hero do the right thing, though Elijah is described as a rare exception to the rule that this character is "never 'bad'".

Shyamalan admitted he was disappointed by the reaction Unbreakable received from the public and critics. Shyamalan also disliked Touchstone Pictures' marketing campaign. He wanted to promote Unbreakable as a comic book movie, but Touchstone insisted on portraying it as a psychological thriller, similar to The Sixth Sense.

=== Later reviews ===
In 2009, filmmaker Quentin Tarantino praised Unbreakable, and included it on his list of the top 20 films released since 1992, the year he became a director. Tarantino praised the film as a "brilliant retelling of the Superman mythology", and said it contains what he considers to be Bruce Willis's best performance. He also criticized the way the film was marketed upon release, stating he felt that it would have been far more effective if the film's advertising simply posed the question of "what if Superman was here on earth, and didn't know he was Superman?"

It has ranked in multiple top lists of superhero movies. In 2011, Time ranked the film at No. 4 in its list of top ten superhero movies of all time, describing it as one of the best superhero origin stories and as a "relatively quiet, subtle and realistic look at the pressures that come with being a superhero." In 2018, The Hollywood Reporter called it a "deconstruction of the American superhero/villain complex" that is "more prescient than ever." Esquire magazine ranked it number 8 in its list of top Superhero movies ever made and Timeout included it in its top 25

Luke Buckmaster writing in Flicks called it one of the greatest Superhero movies ever made, citing its storytelling and complexity while the Guardian noted that it was the first movie which told a Superhero story as a straight drama, and in so doing, changed the genre forever, as other directors copied the style

=== Home media ===
Unbreakable was released on DVD and VHS on June 26, 2001. The DVD version is a THX certified two-disc set that features a DTS audio track, behind-the-scenes footage, deleted scenes and other bonus material. This release sold 2.3 million units in the United States, and was the top DVD video rental of 2001. It grossed a total of $123.11 million from DVD sales and DVD/VHS rentals in the United States. The film thus had a combined global box office and U.S. home video revenue of $371,028,653, with a 495% return on investment.

In 2008, the film was released on Blu-ray which had all the bonus features of the Special Edition on DVD "Vista Series".

In the United Kingdom, the film was watched by 8.7 million viewers on television in 2004, making it the year's third most-watched film on television.

Walt Disney Studios Home Entertainment released the film on Ultra HD Blu-ray and a remastered Blu-ray on September 21, 2021.

=== Accolades ===
Award	Category	Recipient(s)	Result	Ref.
Saturn Award	Best Action/Adventure/Thriller Film		Nominated	
Black Reel Award	Best Film Poster		Nominated	
Golden Trailer Award	Best Horror/Thriller Film		Won	
Blockbuster Entertainment Awards	Favorite Actor – Suspense	Bruce Willis	Nominated	
Blockbuster Entertainment Awards	Favorite Actor – Suspense	Samuel L. Jackson	Nominated	
Blockbuster Entertainment Awards	Favorite Supporting Actor – Suspense	Spencer Treat Clark	Nominated	
Blockbuster Entertainment Awards	Favorite Supporting Actress – Suspense	Robin Wright Penn	Nominated	
Bram Stoker Award	Best Screenplay	M. Night Shayamalan	Nominated	
Nebula Award	Best Script	M. Night Shayamalan	Nominated	
International Horror Guild Award	Best Film		Nominated	
Bogey Awards	Bogey Award in Silver		Won	

== Sequels ==
After the film's release, rumors of possible sequels began circulating in different interviews and in film fansites. In 2000, Bruce Willis was quoted as hoping for an Unbreakable trilogy. In December 2000, Shyamalan denied rumors he wrote Unbreakable as the first installment of a trilogy, saying he was not even thinking about it. In August 2001, Shyamalan stated that, because of successful DVD sales, he had approached Touchstone Pictures about an Unbreakable sequel, an idea Shyamalan said the studio originally turned down because of the film's disappointing box office performance. In a September 2008 article, Shyamalan and Samuel L. Jackson said there was some discussion of a sequel when the film was being made, but that it mostly died with the disappointing box office. Jackson said he was still interested in a sequel but Shyamalan was non-committal. In February 2010, Willis said that Shyamalan was "still thinking about doing the fight movie between me and Sam that we were going to do", and stated that as long as Jackson was able to participate he would be "up for it".

=== Split ===
In September 2010, Shyamalan revealed that an additional villain had been omitted from Unbreakable in anticipation of their inclusion in a sequel, but that the character had instead been used for a forthcoming film he was writing for and producing.

Shyamalan's horror thriller film Split has been described as a thematic sequel to Unbreakable, and was released on January 20, 2017. Although it was filmed substantially as a standalone film, an uncredited cameo by Bruce Willis as David Dunn indeed establishes Split as a story within the same world.

Additionally, Shyamalan has stated the orange-suited villain portrayed by Chance Kelly in Unbreakable was initially going to be the character "The Horde". However, features of The Horde were dropped to make the character simpler in order to keep the focus on David. The original character, Kevin Wendell Crumb, would later be fully realized in Split.

=== Glass ===
Shyamalan expressed hope for a third installment following Split, saying, "I hope [a third Unbreakable film happens]. The answer is yes. I'm just such a wimp sometimes. I don't know what's going to happen when I go off in my room, a week after this film opens, to write the script. But I'm going to start writing. [I have] a really robust outline, which is pretty intricate. But now the standards for my outlines are higher. I need to know I've won already. I'm almost there but I'm not quite there." In April 2017, Shyamalan announced the official title, release date, and returning actors for the third movie. The film, titled Glass, was released on January 18, 2019, and features Bruce Willis, Samuel L. Jackson, Anya Taylor-Joy, and James McAvoy returning to their respective roles in the series.

== See also ==
- List of films featuring home invasions
- List of sole survivors of aviation accidents and incidents
