= Spencer Treat Clark =

American actor (born 1987)

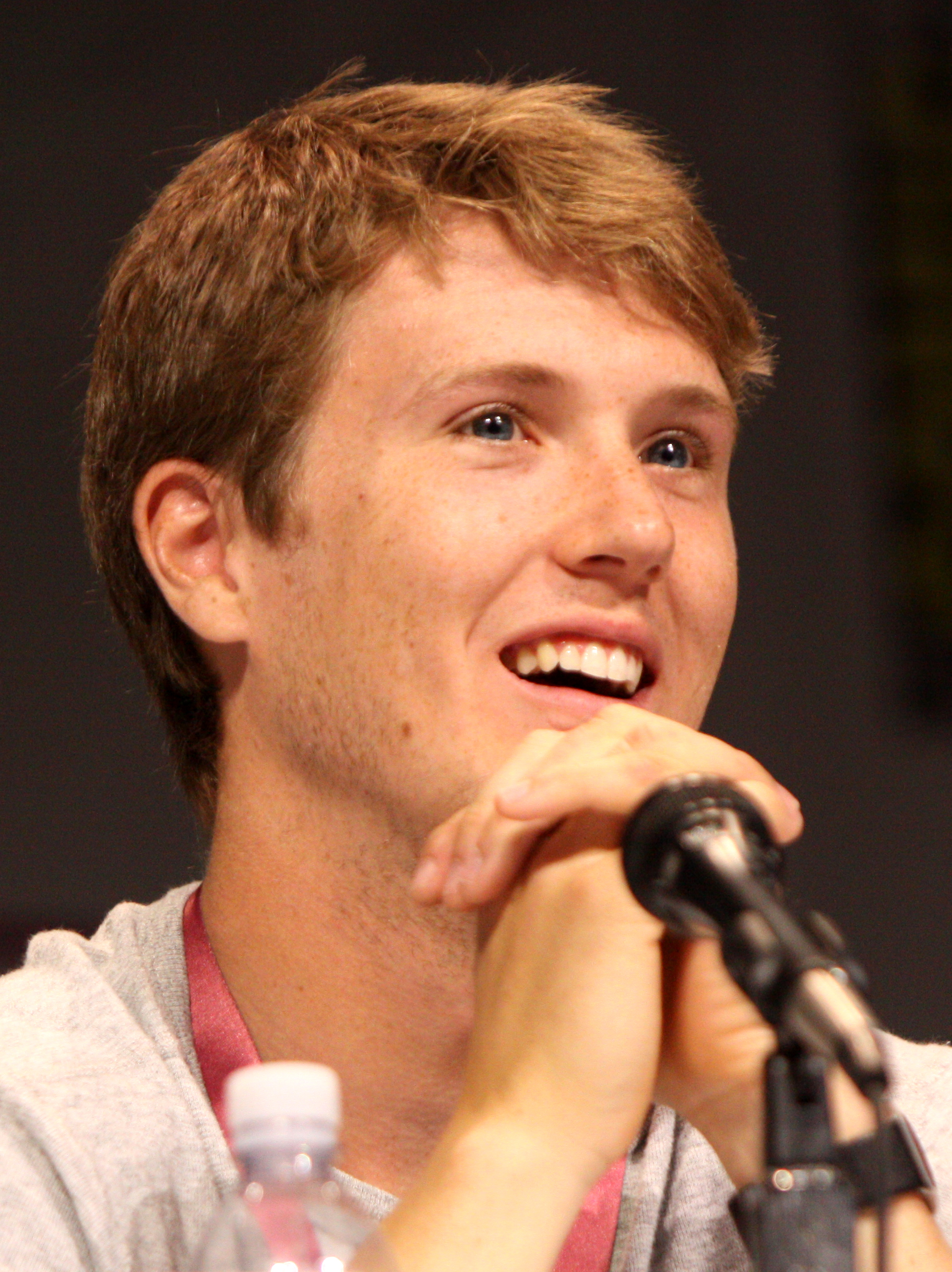
- Clark at the 2013 WonderCon
- Born: September 24, 1987 (age 38); New York City, U.S.
- Occupation: Actor
- Years active: 1995–present
- Children: 1
- Relatives: Eliza Clark (sister); Zack Whedon (brother-in-law)

Spencer Treat Clark (born September 24, 1987) is an American actor. He rose to prominence for his roles in the 2000 films Gladiator and Unbreakable. He has since appeared in the films Mystic River (2003), The Last House on the Left (2009), Much Ado About Nothing (2012), and the Unbreakable sequel Glass (2019).

Clark is also known for his roles in the television series Agents of S.H.I.E.L.D. (2015–2018), where he portrayed Werner von Strucker throughout the third and fifth seasons, and Animal Kingdom (2016–2019).

== Biography ==
Clark was born in New York City. He is the brother of screenwriter and playwright Eliza Clark. He began his career in 1995, appearing on the television show Another World. His film debut was in Arlington Road.

He appeared in the series finale of Mad Men and in the 2014 film Cymbeline. As of 2019, Clark has a recurring role on the television series Animal Kingdom.

On August 30, 2021, it was announced that Clark would appear as Mike Ryerson in an adaptation of Stephen King's 'Salem's Lot for Warner Bros. Pictures and New Line Cinema.

== Filmography ==
=== Film ===
Year	Title	Role	Notes
1996	Christmas in Cartoontown	N/A	Voice role; direct-to-video
1999	Arlington Road	Grant Faraday	
1999	Double Jeopardy	Matty Parsons - Age 11	
2000	Gladiator	Lucius Verus Aurelius	
2000	Unbreakable	Joseph Dunn	
2003	Mystic River	Ray "Silent Ray" Harris Jr.	
2005	Loverboy	Paul Stoll (age 16)	
2007	The Babysitters	Scott Miral	
2007	Superheroes	Nick Jones	
2009	The Last House on the Left	Justin Stillo	
2010	Camp Hope	Timothy	
2010	Jolly Bankers	Conrad	Short film
2012	Much Ado About Nothing	Borachio	
2012	Deep Dark Canyon	Nate Towne	
2013	The Last Exorcism Part II	Chris	
2014	Druid Peak	Owen	
2014	Cymbeline	Guiderius	
2014	The Town That Dreaded Sundown	Corey Holland	
2015	The Girlfriend Game	Eddie	Short film
2016	Ice Scream	Mickey	
2019	Glass	Joseph Dunn	
2022	Weird: The Al Yankovic Story	Steve Jay	
2024	Salem's Lot	Mike Ryerson	
2027	The Rescue †	TBA	Post-production

=== Television ===
Year	Title	Role	Notes
1995	It Was Him or Us	Jesse Pomeroy	Television film
1995–1999	Another World	Steven Michael Frame #3	Unknown episodes
1999	Third Watch	Kyle	Episode: "Impulse"
2004	Law & Order: Special Victims Unit	Brian Coyle	Episode: "Families"
2009	The Good Wife	Kenny Chatham	Episode: "Home"
2011	Law & Order: Special Victims Unit	Greg Engels	Episode: "Spectacle"
2011	The Closer	Jesse Dixon	Episode: "Repeat Offender"
2015	Mad Men	Kelly	Episode: "Person to Person"
2015–2018	Agents of S.H.I.E.L.D.	Werner von Strucker	Recurring role, 8 episodes
2016–2019	Animal Kingdom	Adrian Dolan	Recurring role, 27 episodes
2017	NCIS	Ryan	Episode: "Keep Going"
2018	Criminal Minds	Jordan	Episode: "Ashley"
2019	Chilling Adventures of Sabrina	Jerathmiel	Episode: "Chapter Seventeen: The Missionaries"
2024	Station 19	James Beckett, Jr.	Episode: "Good Grief"
2024	Manhunt	Lewis Powell	Recurring role, 4 episodes
2025	Chicago Fire	Lee	Episode: "Born of Fire"
2025	S.W.A.T.	Gary	Episode: "Higher Ground"
2025	The Gringo Hunters	Justin Miller	Episode: "Escape to Baja"
