= Jen Lewin =

American artist

- Citizenship: US
- Occupation: Artist
- Known for: Sculpture; Public Art; Interactive Art
- Spouses: Kimbal Musk (m. 2001; div. 2010) William (Bill) Magnuson (m. 2015)
- Children: 2
- Website: jenlewinstudio.com

Jen Lewin is an American interactive public artist based in New York City. She is known for designing and fabricating large-scale interactive public artworks that combine sculpture, light, sound, custom electronics, software, and engineering to create immersive, participatory environments. Her work explores the relationship between people, technology, and the natural world through installations that respond to touch, movement, and collective interaction

== Personal life ==
Lewin grew up in Maui and obtained her BA in Architecture and Computer Aided Design from the University of Colorado Boulder, later obtaining her M.P.S. degree in Interactive Design from Tisch School of the Arts.

Lewin married Kimbal Musk in 2001, brother of Elon Musk. They had two children together. They divorced in 2010. Lewin married William "Bill" Magnuson in 2015, and currently lives with Bill and their two children in New York City.

In 2015, Lewin purchased a 4-story condo in Manhattan for 7 million dollars.

== Career ==
=== Early career ===
Following her graduate studies at New York University, Lewin established a multidisciplinary practice combining architecture, engineering, interactive design, and sculpture. Drawing on her background in environmental design and digital technologies, she began developing installations that integrated custom electronics, responsive lighting systems, sensors, and software to create artworks that changed in response to human interaction. Rather than producing static objects, Lewin's practice emphasized participation, encouraging viewers to become active contributors to the work through movement and touch.

=== Interactive public art ===
Since the early 2000s, Lewin has focused on creating large-scale interactive public artworks that combine sculpture, light, sound, and engineering. Many of her installations are designed for plazas, parks, museums, festivals, and other civic spaces, where they respond in real time to participants through pressure sensors, motion detection, and programmable LED lighting. Her work frequently explores themes of human connection, collective behaviour, and the relationship between natural systems and technology.

One of Lewin's best-known works is The Pool, an interactive installation first presented at Burning Man in 2008. Comprising hundreds of illuminated circular platforms that change colour when stepped upon, the work has toured internationally and has been exhibited at festivals and public art events including Vivid Sydney, Signal Festival in Prague, Light Marina Bay in Singapore, Brisbane Festival, Montréal en Lumière, BLINK Cincinnati, Canal Convergence in Scottsdale, and numerous exhibitions throughout Europe, Asia, Australia, and North America.

In addition to temporary exhibitions, Lewin has produced interactive public artworks for airports, educational institutions, municipalities, and private developments. Notable commissions include The Aurora (2021) at Minneapolis–Saint Paul International Airport; Helix and Andante (2021) in Doral, Florida; Flow (2020) at ʻIolani School in Honolulu; Jeju Pool (2018) in South Korea; Promenade (2018) in Denver; Sidewalk Harp (2015) in Minneapolis; and Magical Harp, which has been installed at multiple sites including Palo Alto and Redwood City, California.

Lewin has exhibited internationally at institutions including Oklahoma Contemporary, the Hong Kong Arts Centre, the Stavros Niarchos Foundation Cultural Center in Athens, the Museum of Design Atlanta, and the University of Colorado Boulder Art Museum. She has also participated in recurring international light festivals and biennials, including Takanawa Gateway Fest in Tokyo, Vivid Sydney, Signal Festival, i Light Marina Bay, the Istanbul Light Festival, the Gwangju Design Biennale, and the Biennial of the Americas.

Alongside her independent practice, Lewin has collaborated with artists and designers on several public artworks. She developed the lighting for Paint Torch (2011), a monumental sculpture by Claes Oldenburg and Coosje van Bruggen now in the collection of the Pennsylvania Academy of the Fine Arts, and collaborated with Lawrence Argent on Water Tree (2010), a permanent public sculpture in Vail, Colorado.

Lewin has produced a number of permanent public art installations in civic, cultural, and institutional contexts. These works form part of a broader body of interactive sculptures installed in public spaces internationally.

Notable permanent commissions include Cyclicality (2025), installed at the Washington Pavilion in Sioux Falls, South Dakota. The work consists of large-scale interactive sculptural elements incorporating light-responsive and reflective materials and is designed for public interaction in an outdoor civic setting.

Other permanent installations include Promenade, a site-specific interactive light installation in Denver, Colorado, developed for the Dairy Block Art Collection and designed as an environment responsive to movement and audience participation.

Additional permanent works include Boundless (Arlington, Virginia), installed as part of a public arts initiative, and multiple installations in Norwalk, Connecticut, including works developed in collaboration with Brookfield Properties for public plaza spaces.

These commissions are part of a larger portfolio of permanent installations by Jen Lewin Studio located in public parks, transportation hubs, civic plazas, and cultural institutions across the United States and internationally.

== Works ==
=== Installations ===
- 2026 Gowanus NYC, The Ursa’s
- 2026 Yakima Washington, Favi
- 2025 Sioux Falls, South Dakota, Cyclicality
- 2024 Doral, Florida: Myco
- 2024 Santa Clara, CA: Magical Harp
- 2023 Cincinnati Public Library: Phronesis
- 2023 Arlington Rotery Club: Boundless
- 2022 Green House, Long Island City
- 2021 Minneapolis Saint Paul International Airport: The Aurora
- 2021 Arlington Doral, Florida: Helix and Andante
- 2020 Redwood City: Magical Harp and Light Pools
- 2020 Walnut Creek: Light Pool
- 2020 Iolani School, Honolulu, Hawaii: Flow
- 2017 Burning Man and Descanso Gardens: Aqueous
- 2015 Be The Match Foundation, Minneapolis: Sidewalk Harp
- 2015 The Magical Bridge Playground, Palo Alto: Magical Harp
- 2017 University of Ohio Akron, Flux Chandelier
- 2017 Coral Springs Florida, Art Walk: Ascent by Jen Lewin

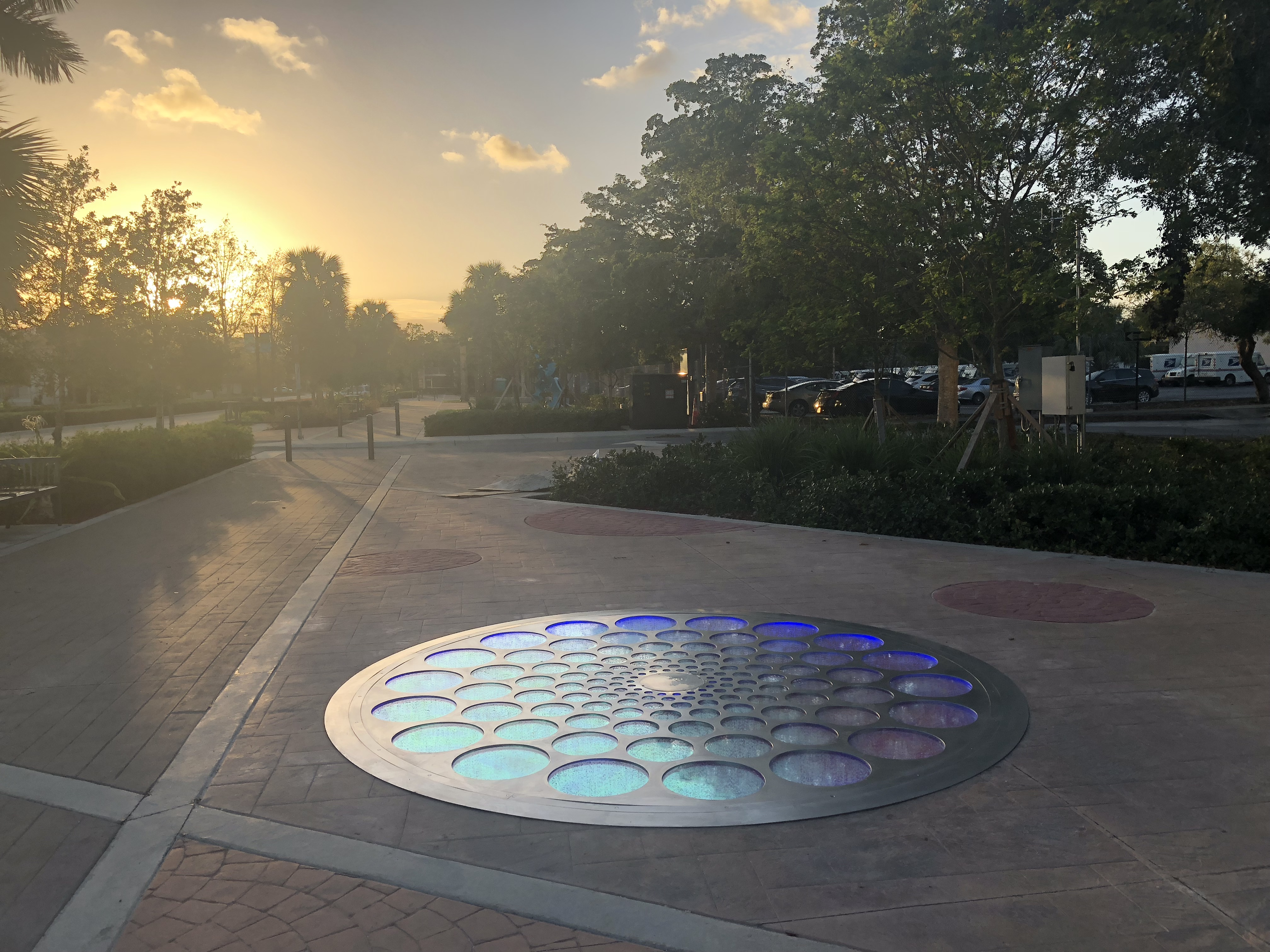
* Interactive sculpture titled "Ascent" by Lewin permanently installed in the Art Walk of Coral Spring Florida

- 2010 Solaris, Vail: The Water Tree by Lawrence Argent, Light Art by Jen Lewin

=== Exhibitions ===
2024

- Discovery Green, Houston TX: Atlas
- Lumenaura, Aurora, IL: The Pool
- Burning Man, Black Rock City: The Other, Man Pavilion

2023

- Charlotte International Arts Festival – Aqueous
- Burning Man, Black Rock City: The Ursa's.
- Vivid Sydney – The Last Ocean: “Antarctica”
- Celebration Square Mississauga: Ursa Minor

2022

- Lights on Stratford, Ontario: The Pool
- Exploratorium, San Francisco: The Last Ocean
- Canal Convergence, Scottsdale: The Last Ocean
- Beacon Park, Detroit: The Last Ocean
- Burning Man, Black Rock City: The Last Ocean
- Brisbane Festival, Brisbane: The Pool
- Digital Garden, Mount Gambier: The Pool
- Illuminate Adelaide, Adelaide: Chandelier Harp and The Pool
- Industry City, Brooklyn: The Pool

2021

- Stavros Niachros Foundation Center, Athens: Aqueous
- Current Show, DUMBO Brooklyn: Anti-Chandelier
- Domino Park: Reflect

2020

- Takanawa Gateway Fest, Tokyo
- Oklahoma Contemporary
- Hong Kong Arts Centre
- Redwood City: Magical Harp and Light Pools
- Walnut Creek: Light Pool
- MSP Signature Work (Minneapolis Saint Paul Terminal 1.)
- Light Wall, Iolani School, Honolulu, Hawaii

2019

- Aushans Harp, Aurora, Colorado
- Euclid, Norwalk, CT, Brookfield Place
- Norwalk Cloud, Norwalk, CT, Brookfield Place

2018

- Vivid Sydney
- Jeju Pool, South Korea
- Promenade, Denver

2017

- Georgetown Glow, Georgetown DC: Aqueous
- Visual Arts Week, Mexico City: The Pool
- Enchanted Forest of Light, Descanso Gardens, Los Angeles: Aqueous
- BLINK Cincinnati: The Pool
- Worlds Fair Nano, Brooklyn: Aqueous
- Jing An Kerry Centre, Shanghai: The Pool
- Burning Man Black Rock City Honoraria, Black Rock City: Aqueous
- Light Festival Jerusalem: The Pool
- Chattanooga: The Pool
- Light City, Baltimore: Reflect
- Hong Kong Arts Festival:Hong Kong

2016

- Arrow Arts Challenge, Denver, Colorado
- Cherry Creek Arts Festival, Denver, Colorado
- Midtown Crossing at Turner Park, Omaha, Nebraska
- WAVE: Light + Sound + Art, Breckenridge, Colorado
- NYCxDESIGN at the Design Pavilion, New York City
- B-Light Festival, Manama
- Mother of the Nation Festival, Abu Dhabi
- Light City, Baltimore
- i Light Marina Bay, Singapore
- SPECTRA, Aberdeen
- Winter Lights at Canary Wharf, London

2015

- Luna Fete, New Orleans
- Istanbul Light Festival, Istanbul
- igNIGHT, Fort McMurray
- Burning Man
- Cherry Creek Arts Festival at Stanley
- Astana, Kazakhstan
- Bonnaroo Music Festival
- Summer in Paradise, West Palm Beach, Florida
- Montreal en Lumiere, Montreal, Quebec
- Canal Convergence, Scottsdale, Arizona

2014

- University of Warwick Arts Centre
- Signal Festival, Prague
- Art de Colombo, Lisbon
- Burning Man, Honorarium Artist
- AHA! Light Up Cleveland
- Vivid Sydney
- i Light Marina Bay, Singapore
- Luminosity, Lexington

2013

- Chalk The Block, El Paso
- Conway Artsfest
- Denver Art Biennale
- Escape From Wonderland
- Electric Daisy Carnival, Orlando, NYC, Chicago & Vegas
- University of Colorado Boulder Art Museum, Boulder, Colorado: Its Electric
- South by Southwest Republic Park

2012

- La Napoule Art Foundation, Denver
- Burning Man, Honorarium Project

== Awards ==
- 2023 Lumen Award for Environmental Awareness Through Light: The Last Ocean]
- 2023 Black Rock City Honoraria: The Ursa's
- 2022 The Women in Lighting Award
- 2022 Urban Design & Architecture Design Awards Gold Award: The Aurora
- 2022 Black Rock City Honoraria: The Last Ocean
- 2020 Black Rock City Honoraria: Cosmos
- 2017 CODAaward: Merit Award Public Spaces: Sidewalk Harp
- 2017 Burning Man Arts Black Rock City Honoraria Grant: Aqueous
- 2017 Pre-qualified Public Artist: San Francisco Arts Commission
- 2017 Pre-qualified Public Artist: Houston Arts Alliance
- 2016 CODAvideo Award: Experience: Sidewalk Harp
- 2016 CODAawards Top 100: Sidewalk Harp
- 2016 Pre-qualified Artist, San Antonio Arts Commission
- 2016 CODAvideo Award: Experience: Sidewalk Harp
- 2016 Prequalified Public Artist: Outdoor Public Art, City of Palo Alto
- 2015 Architizer A+, Popular Choice "Edison Cloud"
- 2014 Black Rock Arts Foundation Honorarium, Super Pool
- 2014 Rotational Molding Product Design Competition: 1st Place Professional Division "Learning Gardens"
- 2013 University of Central Arkansas - Artist in Residence
- 2012 Black Rock Arts Foundation Honorarium, The Arc Harps
- 2008 Burning Man artists grant: The Pool
- 2005 Burning Man Honorarium: "Light Harp"
- 1996 Presidents Fund for Teaching Technology Research Grant
- 1996 Colorado Advanced Software Institute Research Grant
