= Gabriel Rothblatt =

Technoprogressive political activist, writer and speaker

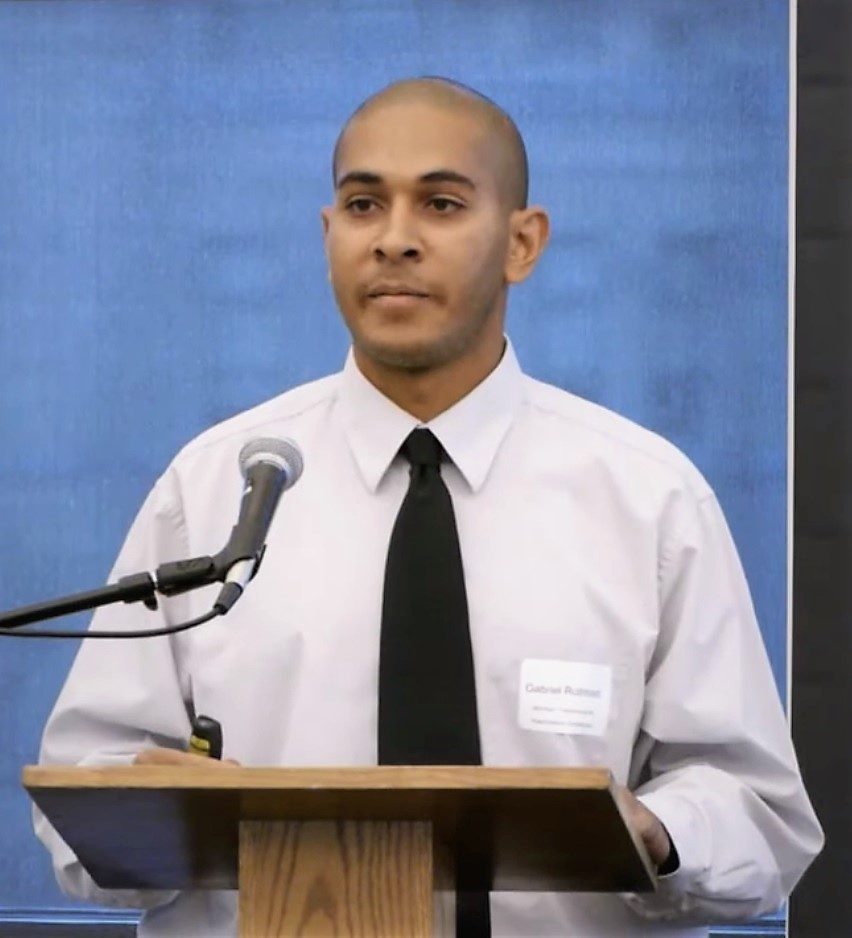
- Rothblatt speaks at the Mormon Transhumanist Association in 2013
- Born: October 5, 1982 (age 43)
- Education: University of Vermont
- Parent(s): Martine Rothblatt, Bina Rothblatt

Gabriel Rothblatt (born October 5, 1982) is an American technoprogressive political activist and a writer and speaker in the futurist and transhumanist movements. He ran for Congress in 2014.

== Early life and education ==
Born to Bina and transgender businesswoman Martine Rothblatt, Rothblatt is Black, Jewish, and comes from an LGBTQ family. His mother Martine Rothblatt founded Sirius Satellite Radio, United Therapeutics and other companies. After graduating from high school, he earned a degree in political philosophy at the University of Vermont. He works for MIO, LLC as a property manager and has previously managed a restaurant franchise and worked as an insurance broker. His great-grandfather, Isadore Rothblatt, was a union organizer and was beaten to death by anti-union activists because of his union activities with the Leatherworker's Union of Chicago. Rothblatt and his wife Taj divorced in June 2021. They have four children together.

== Activism ==
=== Human rights ===
Rothblatt is an outspoken advocate for human rights. In his 2014 congressional campaign, he was endorsed by the National Organization for Women and the Teamsters Local Union 769. He also was a featured speaker at the South Brevard NAACP's banquet dinner. He is a Member Delegate of the Space Coast Progressive Alliance and Vice President of the Brevard Chapter of the American Civil Liberties Union.

=== Space ===
Rothblatt is an advocate for space, public speaker on the advantageous of investing in space settlements, and President of the Florida Space Development Council, the National Space Society's local chapter. In a talk hosted by students from SEDS, at the University of Michigan, Rothblatt advocated that space exploration should not resemble the space race but should be an endeavor of international collaboration. In a congressional debate, Rothblatt stated that he believes missions to the moon, Mars, and asteroids should be a priority, and under the right plan 1,000 people could be in space within a decade. Space was such a significant part of Rothblatt's campaign BBC News ran a story covering both candidates position on space and titled it Florida's space race: The politicians battling over the cosmos. Lisa Miller, from New York magazine, wrote that the first item on Rothblatt's platform is "space." Rothblatt has written on various space topics including spacesteading and panspermia.

=== Transhumanism ===
Rothblatt is a community organizer and member of the board of directors with the Terasem Movement. Rothblatt writes and speaks on transhumanist topics, such as seasteading, cryonics, religion, mind uploading, and technological discrimination.

== Political campaigns ==
During the 2014 Midterm elections, Rothblatt ran as a Democratic Party candidate against incumbent Bill Posey in Florida's 8th congressional district. Rothblatt qualified for the ballot by gathering 4,936 signatures; the minimum required was 4,834. Issues of concern to him were technological unemployment, protecting family values, promoting education, protecting the environment, developing space, and human rights. His belief in transhumanism and his family ties were both regularly covered by the media. Jessica Roy, from Time, commented that his status as a member of Terasem may be just as difficult for his campaign as being a Democrat in the Republican majority district. During a campaign event, gubernatorial candidate Charlie Crist introduced him by saying "Gabriel is the messenger that God sent."

Others were critical of Rothblatt's campaign. Katie Prill, from the National Republican Congressional Committee, wrote that "his radical ideas are too extreme for Florida families." Posey's spokesman, George Cecala, stated that, "It all comes down to the real issue, and that is Bill Posey is a conservative and Gabriel Rothblatt is a liberal. Posey won the election, but Neely Tucker at the Washington Post called his campaign "a respectable debut," and Dustin Ashley wrote that his campaign "opens the door for other transhumanists to become part of the political action."

=== SpacePAC ===
Rothblatt was supported by SpacePAC, a Political Action Committee (PAC) founded by his parents. Under campaign finance laws, PACs are not permitted to collaborate with the candidate. Due to these restrictions, the Rothblatts were not permitted to discuss the campaign together until the election was over. The New York Times criticized the PAC because it was run by his parents. USA Today reported that Rothblatt was unaware of his parents PAC until he saw yard signs promoting his candidacy. According to William Patrick, from Watchdog.org, Posey knew of the family relationship between Rothblatt and the PAC, but Posey declined to comment. Dave Berman, from Florida Today, noted that even with the support of SpacePAC, Posey's campaign had far more funds than Rothblatt's campaign. Alex Leary, from the Tampa Bay Times reported that SpacePAC was not the first PAC to be set up by a wealthy parents to support their child's campaign.
