= A Living Poem =

Poem by Sasha Stiles

- Poem by Sasha Stiles
- Country: United States
- Location: Hyundai Card Digital Wall, Museum of Modern Art
- Opened: September 10, 2025
- Closed: March 3, 2026
- Curator: Martha Joseph
- Follows: Light: Rafaël Rozendaal
- Followed by: Peggy Weil: Core Memory

A Living Poem is an AI-generated poem by Sasha Stiles. The poem's contents are regenerated by her AI alter-ego Technelegy every sixty minutes, with a machine-like voice heard speaking. It was exhibited at the Museum of Modern Art's (MoMa) Hyundai Card Digital Wall from September 2025 to March 2026.

After publishing her poetry collection Technelegy in 2021, Stiles was invited to exhibit at the Wall by MoMA curators Stuart Comer and Martha Joseph. She later trained Technelegy on MoMA's text-art collection metadata to produce A Living Poem, while also using her own writings. Drawing inspiration from such themes as text art and the historical origins of poetry, the poem has been examined for its use of themes such as human psychology, the philosophy of artificial intelligence, and the relationship between humanity and technology.

== Content ==
A Living Poem is a visual poem co-written by Stiles and her AI alter-ego Technelegy, who regenerates its contents in an infinite loop every sixty minutes. It starts every rotating period with the stanza "Inspiration moves me. / I call it breath" is shown, before asking viewers to "take a breath". Frames shown on A Living Poem can also come in multiple colors or show gradients in the background, and they may also show multiple square panels or one background. The poem's aesthetics draw from early computer terminal screens with green tints and juxtaposes them with layering in digital image processing, and in line with this aesthetic, a text cursor often appears and a computer code-like digital font representing Technelegy is used.

A Living Poem often discusses automation and creativity as a theme in its stanzas; Brian Droitcour of Cultured calls this a contrast with the power language themes present in the work of Jenny Holzer and Barbara Kruger. The poetry in A Living Poem also uses ambiguous language and poem-styled rhetoric. Although Stiles describes A Living Poem as "an infinite epic", Terry Nguyen of The Brooklyn Rail characterizes it as lyric poetry. In addition to the font representing Technelegy, Stiles' unique Cursive Binary font is used for the poetry.

To create A Living Poem, Technelegy runs on the Museum of Modern Art's text-art metadata; Nguyen compares this to Refik Anadol's 2023 installation Unsupervised, except through a "more discursive [but] no less bland" approach where each line is traceable to one specific artwork in the MoMA collection. In addition to the metadata, Stiles' own writings were used to produce the poem, as well as GPT-4 and p5.js. In this regard, she calls the work a "poem in residence" which changes on a large screen.

An electronic music-like soundscape for A Living Poem, also accessible with a QR code, was composed by Stiles' husband and studio partner Kris Bones. A machine-like voice is also heard speaking throughout the poem.

== Background ==
Sasha Stiles became interested in human–machine relationships while reading science fiction during her youth, eventually leading her to an interest in large language models with its growing technological advancements in 2017. Despite lacking a background in AI or computer programming, she became inspired to do AI-related work by Gwern Branwen, Ross Goodwin, and Allison Parrish. In 2019, she started training an AI model named Technelegy, and in 2021, Black Spring Press published her poetry collection Technelegy, where she combines AI-generated content produced by the titular model with her own traditionally-created work. This process eventually provided the basis for A Living Poem's creation.

Regarding the decision to combine AI and poetry for A Living Poem, Stiles explained that it "is a way of saying there's something very human about the fundamental impulses behind technologies like AI. I think about poetry as our most ancient hybrid intelligence, a way of interlinking algorithm and emotion very much in the way our new technologies are." Stiles also cited as inspirations metapoetics, including the 1967 generative poem The House of Dust; artists such as Jenny Holzer, Barbara Kruger, Bruce Nauman, and Ed Ruscha; and technological inspirations behind modern text art, including printing and computer technology and mass media. Luna Last-Bernal of The Luna Collective also cites the oral tradition behind the origins of poetry as another inspiration.

=== Release ===
A Living Poem debuted at the Agnes Gund Garden Lobby on September 10, 2025, as the fourth work to appear on the Hyundai Card Digital Wall. It was curated by Martha Joseph, an associate curator at MoMA's Department of Media and Performance, and Juyeon Song, a Hyundai Card exchange visitor at MoMA. Stiles had been invited to have her work appear on the wall by Joseph alongside fellow MoMA curator Stuart Comer. Originally set to end on December 15, it ran until March 3, 2026. This was not Stiles' first time collaborating with MoMA, as she participated at their MoMA Postcard blockchain project in 2023.

An online version of A Living Poem was also made available on MoMA's site, as well as on Stiles' website. The poem also inspired A Living Poem: The Codex, a book whose copies are unique.

== Reception and themes ==
Shae Centanni of Washington Square News remarked that A Living Poem "shows how, with the right care, artificial intelligence can be an artist's most treasured tool", explaining that it counters the idea of existential risk from artificial intelligence by "treat[ing] it as a mirror, a muse and a medium for creativity". Droitcour remarked that "MoMA has opted in so hard to A.I. that it's another way of opting out—gliding over" the installation, explaining that "museums can choose not to become data centers that grind their collections into digital slurry". Last-Bernal called it "Frankenstein's monster as an immortal living poem—autonomous, ever-changing and evolving before your very eyes".

Centanni describes the perceived uniquity of each visit to the exhibition as the "most compelling element of this installation", citing for example the introspective and visceral nature of several verses, which allow the poem's algorithm to "understand this deeply human experience". Last-Bernal notes that this provides "a uniquely subjective encounter for every viewer" by providing verses "shaped by the viewer's own internal landscape", and that the soundscape enhances the immersive nature of the poem. Droitcour called A Living Poem "the kind of visceral, intimate confrontations between bodies and technologies that can be found in performances or small Brooklyn galleries". Nguyen said that despite its tendency to display human emotions or self-awareness, the poem's penchant for direct address "only emphasizes the distance between the machine-speaker and reader", comparing this to the knowledge limitations inherent in large language models.

Writing for Scientific American, Deni Ellis Béchard noted the contrast between combining poetry and AI in A Living Poem, saying "one [is] deeply human; the other cold and mechanical". Centanni notes that A Living Poem challenges the idea of art by being capable of infinite regeneration, explaining that Technelegy "blurs the boundaries between humans and AI while creating art". Last-Bernal said that the poem depicts the art of poetry as "a medium of living and evolving communication" and "synthesiz[es] her artistic process with technology", in line with her combination of emerging technology and creative writing.
