= Singapore Youth Olympic Games Organising Committee =

2010 event organisers

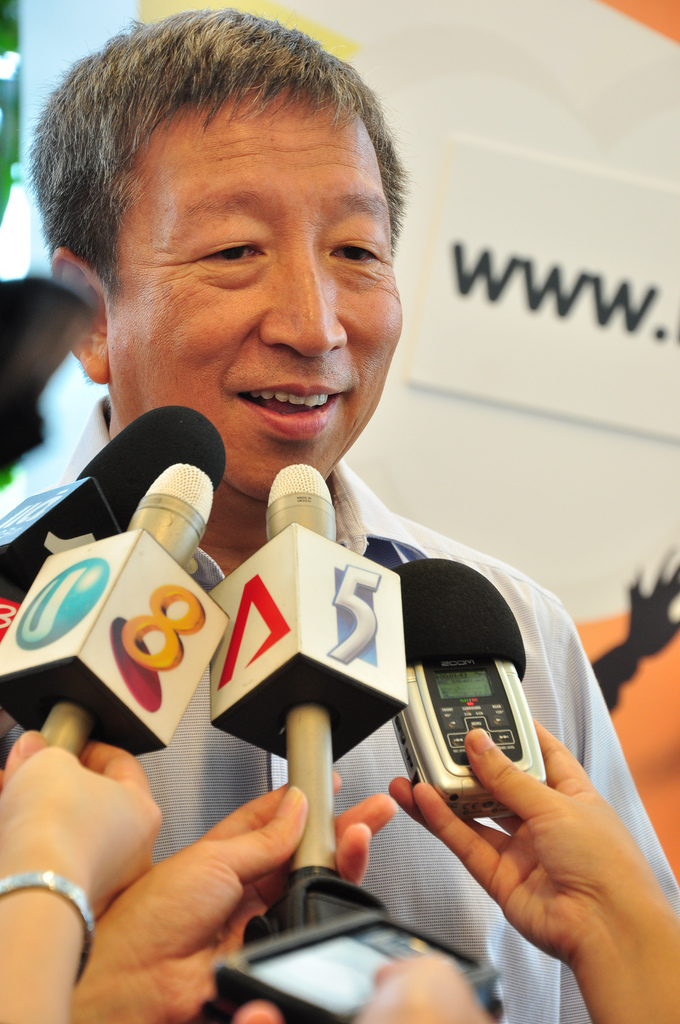
Ng Ser Miang, Vice-President of the SNOC and Chairman of the SYOGOC, speaking to reporters in April 2009

The Singapore Youth Olympic Games Organising Committee (SYOGOC) is the organisation in charge of organising the inaugural 2010 Youth Olympic Games. A selection process to determine the members of the games' organising committee commenced soon after the bid result announcement. Plans were made to have the committee visit the IOC, to obtain greater details on organising the event. The 23 members of the Singapore Youth Olympic Games Organising Committee (SYOGOC) were announced on 24 March 2008 as follows:

Singapore Youth Olympic Games advisory committee members
Position	Member	Portfolio
Chairman	Ng Ser Miang	International Olympic Committee Executive Board member in Singapore, Vice Chairman, SNOC
Deputy Chairman	Niam Chiang Meng	Former Permanent Secretary, Ministry of Community Development, Youth and Sports
Advisor	Kelly Fairweather	Chief Executive Officer, Sport Performance Institute, Stellenbosch University and former Director (Sports), International Olympic Committee
Chief Executive Officer	Brigadier-General(NS) Goh Kee Nguan	
Member	Alex Chan	Former Chairman, Singapore Sports Council
Member	Chris Chan	Secretary-General, Singapore National Olympic Council
Member	Chang Hwee Nee	Former Deputy Secretary (Policy), Ministry of Education
Member	Patrick Daniel	Editor-in-Chief, Singapore Press Holdings Ltd
Member	Kenny Eng	Business Development Manager, Nyee Phoe Group and Director, Gardenasia
Member	Noel Hon	Former Chairman, Singapore Kindness Movement
Member	Koh Seng Leong	Olympic sailor
Member	Kwek Leng Joo	Managing Director, City Developments Limited and Vice Chairman, Singapore Business Federation
Member	Asst. Prof C Kunalan	Secretary, Singapore National Olympic Council Anti-Doping in Sports Commission
Member	Low Teo Ping	President, Singapore Sailing Federation and Vice-President, Singapore National Olympic Council
Member	Oon Jin Teik	Former Chief Executive Officer, Singapore Sports Council
Member	Michael Palmer	Member of Parliament (Pasir Ris-Punggol Group Representation Constituency) and Partner, Harry Elias Partnership
Member	Annabel Pennefather	President, Singapore Hockey Federation and Vice-President, Singapore National Olympic Council
Member	Shaun Seow	Deputy CEO (News, Radio, Print), MediaCorp
Member	Sim Gim Guan	Deputy Secretary (Information & Corporate Management), Ministry of Information, Communications and the Arts
Member	Dr Benedict Tan	Chairman, Singapore National Olympic Council Athletes’ Commission
Member	Dr Tan Eng Liang	Vice-President, Singapore National Olympic Council
Member	Josephine Teo Li Min	Member of Parliament (Bishan-Toa Payoh Group Representation Constituency) and Assistant Secretary-General and Director (Youth Development), National Trades Union Congress
Member	Zainudin Nordin	Member of Parliament (Bishan-Toa Payoh Group Representation Constituency) and Mayor, Central Singapore District

The SYOGOC would be aided by a panel of advisors, composed of Cabinet ministers Vivian Balakrishnan, Teo Chee Hean, Tharman Shanmugaratnam and Ng Eng Hen, and former Parliamentary Secretary, Ministry of Community Development, Youth & Sports (MCYS) Teo Ser Luck. In addition, an Inter-Ministry Committee was established with Niam Chiang Meng, former Permanent Secretary, MCYS as its chairman. Comprising five sub-committees on Sports, Culture and Education, Community Outreach, Youth Engagement and Business and Marketing, its members would be announced at a later date.

== See also ==
- Vancouver Organizing Committee for the 2010 Olympic and Paralympic Winter Games (VANOC)
- Beijing Organizing Committee for the Olympic Games
