= Martine Rothblatt =

American lawyer, writer and businessperson

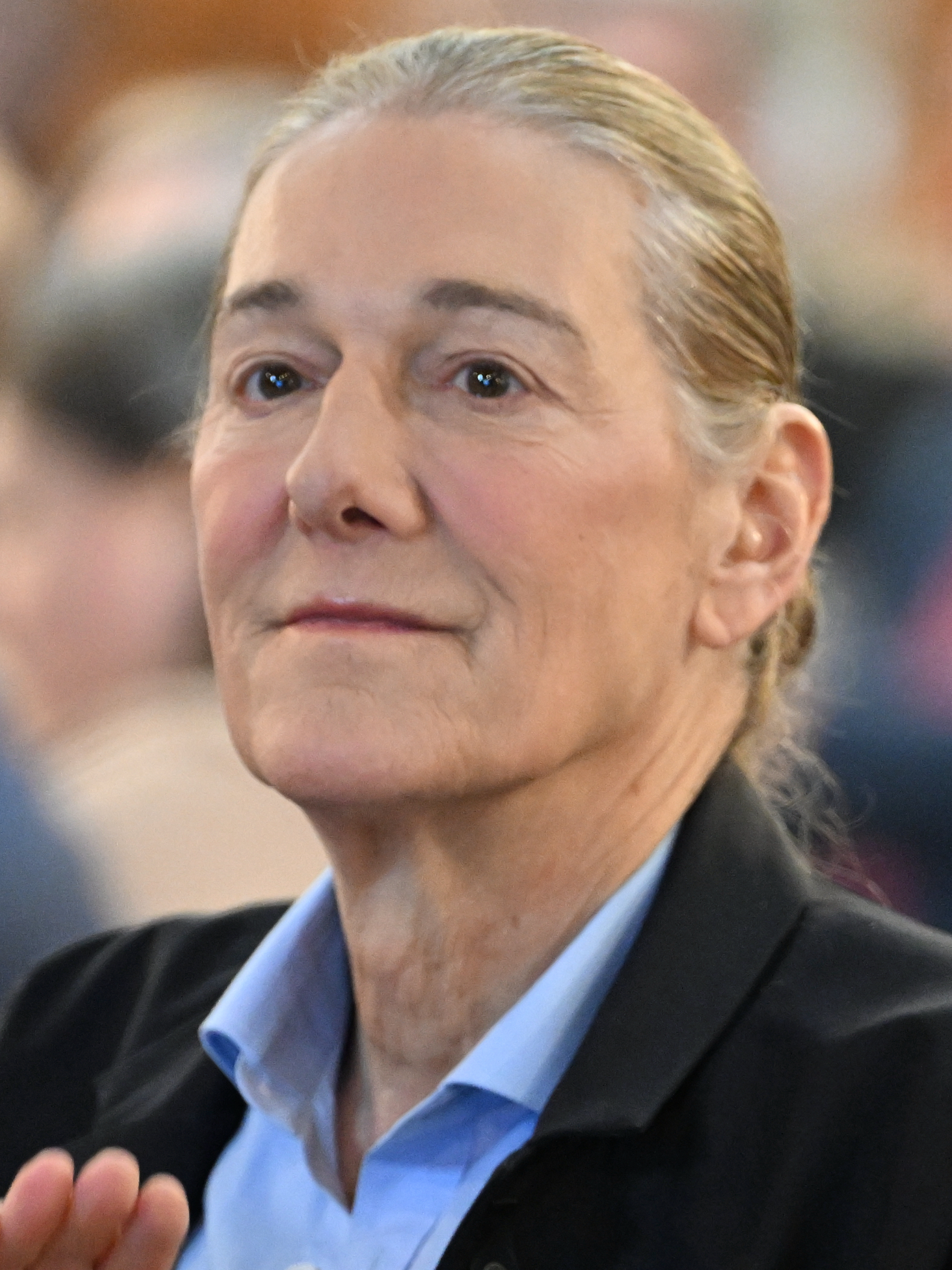
- Rothblatt in March 2024
- Born: 1954 (age 71–72); Chicago, Illinois, U.S.
- Education: University of California, Los Angeles (B.A., J.D, M.B.A); Barts and The London School of Medicine and Dentistry (Ph.D.)
- Occupation: Chairwoman of United Therapeutics
- Spouse: Bina Rothblatt (m. 1982)
- Children: 4

Martine Aliana Rothblatt (born 1954) is an American lawyer, author, and entrepreneur. Rothblatt graduated from University of California, Los Angeles with J.D. and M.B.A. degrees in 1981, then began to work in Washington, D.C., first in the field of communications satellite law, then in bioethics and biomedicine. She is also influential in the field of aviation, particularly electric aviation, as well as with sustainable building.

She is the founder and chairwoman of the board of United Therapeutics. She was also the CEO of GeoStar and the creator of SiriusXM Satellite Radio. She was the top earning CEO in the biopharmaceutical industry in 2018.

== Early life and education ==
Rothblatt was born in 1954 into an observant Jewish family in Chicago, Illinois, to Rosa Lee and Hal Rothblatt, a dentist. She was raised in a suburb of San Diego, California.

Rothblatt left college after two years and traveled throughout Europe, Turkey, Iran, Kenya, and the Seychelles. It was at the NASA tracking station in the Seychelles, during the summer of 1974, that she had her epiphany to unite the world via satellite communications. She then returned to University of California, Los Angeles (UCLA), graduating summa cum laude in communication studies in 1977, with a thesis on international direct-broadcast satellites.

As an undergraduate, she became a convert to Gerard K. O'Neill's "High Frontier" plan for space colonization after analyzing his 1974 Physics Today cover story on the concept as a project for Professor Harland Epps' Topics in Modern Astronomy seminar. Rothblatt subsequently became an active member of the L5 Society and its Southern California affiliate, the Organization for the Advancement of Space Industrialization and Settlement (OASIS).

During her four-year J.D./M.B.A. program, also at UCLA, she published five articles on the law of satellite communications and prepared a business plan for the Hughes Space and Communications Group titled PanAmSat about how satellite spot beam technology could be used to provide communication service to multiple Latin American countries. She also became a regular contributor on legal aspects of space colonization to the OASIS newsletter.

== Career ==
=== Satellite communications ===
Upon graduating from UCLA in 1981 with a joint J.D./M.B.A. degree, Rothblatt was hired by the Washington, D.C., law firm of Covington & Burling to represent the television broadcasting industry before the Federal Communications Commission in the areas of direct broadcast satellites and spread spectrum communication. In 1982, she left to study astronomy at the University of Maryland, College Park, but was soon retained by NASA to obtain FCC approval for the IEEE C band system on its tracking and data relay satellites and by the National Academy of Sciences' Committee on Radio Frequencies to safeguard before the FCC radio astronomy quiet bands used for deep space research. Later that year she was also retained as vice president by Gerard K. O'Neill to handle business and regulatory matters for her newly invented satellite navigation technology, known as the Geostar System.

Rothblatt is a regulatory attorney. She also served as a member of the Space Studies Institute (SSI) board of trustees.

In 1984, she was retained by Rene Anselmo, founder of Spanish International Network, to implement her PanAmSat MBA thesis as a new company that would compete with the global telecommunications satellite monopoly, Intelsat. In 1986, she discontinued her astronomy studies and consulting work to become the full-time CEO of Geostar Corporation, under William E. Simon as chairman. She left Geostar in 1990 to create both WorldSpace and Sirius Satellite Radio. She left Sirius in 1992 and WorldSpace in 1997 to become the full-time chairman and CEO of American medical biotechnology company United Therapeutics.

Rothblatt was responsible for launching several communications satellite companies, including the first private international spacecom project (PanAmSat, 1984), the first global satellite radio network (WorldSpace, 1990), and the first non-geostationary satellite-to-car broadcasting system (Sirius Satellite Radio, 1990). Rothblatt helped pioneer airship internet services with her Sky Station project in 1997, together with Alexander Haig. She then successfully led the effort to get the US Federal Communications Commission (FCC) to allocate frequencies for airship-based internet services.

As an attorney-entrepreneur, Rothblatt was also responsible for leading the efforts to obtain worldwide approval, via new international treaties, of satellite orbit/spectrum allocations for space-based navigation services (1987) and for direct-to-person satellite radio transmissions (1992). She also led the International Bar Association's biopolitical project to develop a draft Universal Declaration on the Human Genome and Human Rights for the United Nations (whose final version was adopted by the UNESCO on November 11, 1997, and endorsed by the United Nations General Assembly on December 9, 1998).

=== Medical and pharmaceutical ===
Rothblatt is a well-known voice for medical and pharmaceutical innovation. In 1994, motivated by her daughter being diagnosed with life-threatening pulmonary hypertension, Rothblatt created the PPH Cure Foundation and in 1996 founded United Therapeutics. That same year, she says, she had sex reassignment surgery. At that time she also began studying for a Ph.D. in medical ethics at the Barts and The London School of Medicine and Dentistry, Queen Mary University of London. The degree was granted in June 2001 based upon her dissertation on the conflict between private and public interests in xenotransplantation. This thesis, defended before England's leading bioethicist John Harris, was later published by Ashgate House under the title Your Life or Mine.

In 2013, Rothblatt was the highest-paid female CEO in America, earning $38 million.

As of April 2018, Rothblatt earned a compensation package worth $37.1 million from United Therapeutics. The majority of the compensation package is for stock options.

In January 2022, Rothblatt's company Lung Biotechnology made an attempt at effectuating her Ph.D. dissertation by transplanting the first genetically-modified porcine heart in hopes that it would successfully save the life of a patient. The recipient subsequently died on Tuesday, March 8, 2022.

In June 2022, Rothblatt unveiled the world's most complex 3D printed object, a human lung scaffold, based on 44 trillion voxels of data and comprising four thousand kilometers of capillaries and 200 million alveoli.

=== Aviation ===
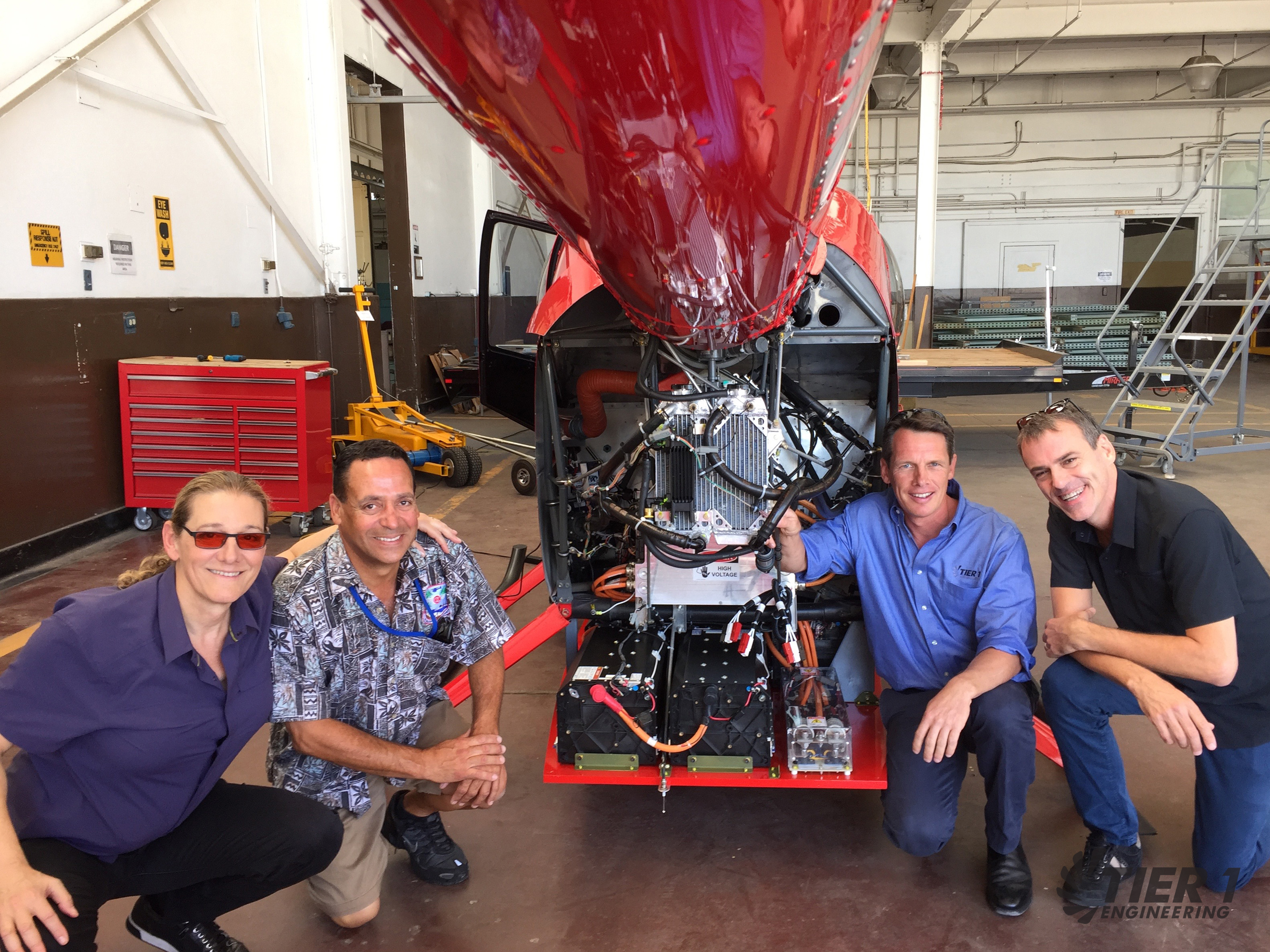
(L-R) Rothblatt, OC Helicopters Pilot Ric Webb, Tier 1 Engineering President Glen Dromgoole, United Therapeutics Executive Vice President Paul Mahon before a flight test at Los Alamitos Army Airfield

Rothblatt is an airplane, seaplane and helicopter pilot with night-vision goggle (NVG) certification. She generally pilots a Pilatus PC-12NG, a Kodiak 100 and a Bell 429WLG. Her other achievements in aviation include providing current weather information to all XM radio-equipped North American aircraft via her SiriusXM satellite system, and pioneering Aircraft Geolocation Tracking via her Geostar Satellite System. In 2018, Rothblatt received the American Helicopter Museum and Education Center Annual Achievement Award for innovation in rotary-wing flight.

==== Electric aviation ====
Rothblatt's company United Therapeutics formed a subsidiary, Lung Biotechnology, to preserve and restore selected donor lungs, making them viable for transplantation. Rothblatt began looking at electric helicopters as a way of reducing energy consumption and noise while reducing transportation time for the sensitive organs.

In September 2016, Rothblatt teamed with Glen Dromgoole of Tier 1 Engineering and pilot Ric Webb of OC Helicopters to conduct the world's first electric-powered full-size helicopter flight at Los Alamitos Army Airfield. The helicopter, a modified Robinson R44 weighed 2,500 pounds with Webb as its test pilot, flew for five minutes, attained 400 feet and exceeded 80 knots airspeed, all completely powered by rechargeable batteries.

On February 16, 2017, Rothblatt's electric helicopter established new world records of a 30-minute duration flight and an 800-foot altitude at Los Alamitos Army Airfield. At the end of the flight, the 2,500 pound helicopter still had 8% state of charge remaining in its Brammo batteries. On March 4, 2017, Rothblatt and Ric Webb set a world speed record for electric helicopters of 100 knots at Los Alamitos Army Airfield under an FAA Experimental permit for tail number N3115T. This was also the first-ever flight of two people in a battery-powered helicopter. On December 7, 2018, Rothblatt earned certification in the Guinness Book of World Records for the farthest distance traveled (56.82 kilometers) by an electric helicopter.

In 2019, she received the inaugural UP Leadership Award for her advances in eVTOL technology. She has continued advancing electric-powered vertical technology, most recently with her proof on March 27, 2025, that hydrogen-powered proton exchange membranes (PEMs) can provide lift electrical power for helicopter rotors, via a first-in-aviation history hover flight of a hydrogen-powered Robinson R44 helicopter at the Roland-Désourdy Airport. Rothblatt expects to achieve FAA approval of her hydrogen-powered helicopters by 2028, and has said that she expects hydrogen-electric powerplants to extend the range of net zero organ delivery helicopters and eVTOLs as compared to battery power.

In September 2021, Rothblatt's project to deliver transplantable organs by electric drones was successfully achieved at Toronto General Hospital (TGH), resulting in the world's first delivery of transplanted lungs by drone.

In October 2022, Rothblatt piloted the historic first-ever electric helicopter flight between two airports, flying from Jacqueline Cochran Regional Airport in Thermal, California, to Palm Springs International Airport.

Rothblatt's United Therapeutics has placed orders with both EHang and BETA Technologies for electric vertical take-off and landing eVTOL aircraft. In June 2021, she was the first flight engineer to fly BETA's ALIA eVTOL aircraft, and as of November 2021 sat on the company’s board of directors.

=== Sustainable building ===
In September 2018, Rothblatt inaugurated the world's largest net zero office building site, called the Unisphere, containing 210,000 square feet of space in Silver Spring, Maryland, powered, heated and cooled completely from on-site sustainable energy technologies. This office building uses 1 MW of solar panels, fifty-two geothermal wells, a quarter mile long earth labyrinth and electrochromic glass to operate with a zero carbon footprint while graphically communicating its net energy status in real time to the building occupants.

== Personal life ==
In 1982, Rothblatt married Bina Aspen, a realtor from Compton, California. Rothblatt and Aspen each had a child from a previous relationship and legally adopted each other's children; they went on to have two more children together.

In 1994, at age 40, she came out as a transgender woman and changed her name to Martine Aliana Rothblatt. She has since become a vocal advocate for transgender rights.

=== Social activism ===
In 2004, Rothblatt launched the Terasem Movement, a transhumanist school of thought focused on promoting joy, diversity, and the prospect of technological immortality via mind uploading and geoethical nanotechnology. Through a charitable foundation, leaders of this school convene publicly accessible symposia, publish explanatory analyses, conduct demonstration projects, issue grants, and encourage public awareness and adherence to Terasem values and goals. The movement maintains a "Terasem Island" on the Internet-based virtual world Second Life, which is currently composed of two sims, which was constructed by the E-Spaces company.

Rothblatt is an advocate for LGBTQ rights and an outspoken opponent of North Carolina's controversial Public Facilities Privacy & Security Act or HB-2 law. In 2016, she gave the keynote presentation at the Moving Trans History Forward conference in Victoria, BC, Canada, entitled From Transgender to Transhuman to Virtually Human.

Through her blog Mindfiles, Mindware and Mindclones, she writes about "the coming age of our own cyberconsciousness and techno-immortality" and started a vlog together with Ulrike Reinhard on the same topic. She also created Lifenaut.com as a place where thousands of people could go to backup their minds.

In 2025, Rothblatt and her digital persona, “Marvatar”, hosted and moderated “The Bridge to Humanizing AI,” a UCLA Department of Communication event marking the department’s 50th anniversary.

Rothblatt contributed $258,000 to SpacePAC, a super PAC that supported her son, Gabriel, who was running as a Democrat in Florida's 8th congressional district but lost. Gabriel is a pastor for the Terasem Movement.

== Reception ==
In May 2024, the University of Maryland School of Medicine awarded Rothblatt the Dean's Distinguished Gold Medal in recognition of her high-impact contributions in medicine and science and in acknowledgement of her commitment to significantly improving the health and well-being of humankind.

Lawyer and bioethicist Wesley J. Smith ridiculed the feasibility of the Terasem Movement Foundation's claims to offer a free service that can "preserve one's individual consciousness so that it remains viable for possible uploading with consciousness software into a cellular regenerated or bionanotechnological body by future medicine and technology". Smith facetiously questioned whether this offer would be followed by the sale of "longevity products".

Rhetorician and technocritic Dale Carrico harshly criticized Rothblatt's writings for promoting what he argues to be the pseudoscience of mind uploading and the techno-utopianism of the Californian Ideology. Carrico later criticized Rothblatt's claims about digital technology and "mindclones" as being nothing more than wishful thinking. Carrico went on to criticize Rothblatt for caring more about rights of "virtual, uploaded persons"—who he argues are neither real nor possible—more than the rights of actual human persons and some animals, such as great apes and dolphins.

Describing a conversation with BINA48, one of "humanity's first cybernetic companions," created by Rothblatt and Hanson Robotics, journalist Amy Harmon concluded it was "not that different from interviewing certain flesh and blood subjects."

== Awards and honors ==
Rothblatt has received many awards, including several honorary doctorate degrees.

In April 2008, Rothblatt was elected a Member of the American Philosophical Society.

On May 11, 2010, she was awarded an honorary doctorate by Ben Gurion University of the Negev in recognition of her accomplishments in satellite communications and biotechnology.

In September 2017, Forbes magazine named Rothblatt one of the 100 Greatest Living Business Minds of the past century, with special reference to her roles as a "perpetual reinventor, founder of Sirius and United Therapeutics, and creator of PanAmSat." On December 5, 2017, North Carolina State University conferred her an honorary Doctor of Sciences degree.

In January 2018 Rothblatt was presented the UCLA Medal, the university's highest award, in recognition of her creation of Sirius XM satellite radio, advancing organ transplant technology, and having "expanded the way we understand fundamental concepts ranging from communication to gender to the nature of consciousness and mortality." On May 16, 2018, Rothblatt and Didi Chuxing President Jean Liu were awarded Doctors of Commercial Science degrees, honoris causa, at NYU's 186th Commencement at Yankee Stadium. She was awarded an Honorary Doctor of Laws (LLD) from the University of Victoria after a nomination by Aaron Devor, Chair in Transgender Studies at the university.

In 2019, Rothblatt was recognized as one of Business Insider's most powerful LGBTQ+ people in tech. Also in 2019, Rothblatt received the Golden Plate Award of the American Academy of Achievement presented by Awards Council member Sir Peter Jackson during the International Achievement Summit in New York City.

In October 2021, the National Business Aviation Association (NBAA) selected Dr. Rothblatt for its highest honor, the Meritorious Service to Aviation Award, for her fostering of aviation weather information on the flight deck and of advanced air mobility such as electric helicopters.

In April 2023, Rothblatt received the Benjamin Franklin Medal for Distinguished Achievement in the Sciences in recognition of her public service contributions.

Through support of the National Space Society and her leadership, the Martine Rothblatt Space Settlement in our Lifetime Prize supports the expansion of humanity beyond Earth.

In 2025, she was awarded two Doctor of Science honoris causa degrees, one from the Elmezzi Graduate School of Molecular Medicine at Northwell Health, and one from Queen Mary University of London.

In January 2025, the University of Verona announced that it would confer Rothblatt an honorary degree in medicine (laurea honoris causa in Medicina non abilitante).

In February 2026, Rothblatt was elected to the National Academy of Engineering for leadership in the fields of spectrum and satellite engineering, organ transplantation, and electric aviation.

In 2026, Forbes ranked Rothblatt eighth on its “Innovator 250” list of America’s greatest innovators.

== Bibliography ==
- Radiodetermination Satellite Services and Standards, Artech House, 1987, ISBN 0-89006-239-0 (communications satellite technology)
- Apartheid of Sex: a Manifesto on the Freedom of Gender, Crown, 1995 ISBN 0-517-59997-X (transgenderism)
- Unzipped Genes, Temple University Press, 1997 ISBN 1-56639-522-4 (bioethics and biopolitics)
- Your Life or Mine, Ashgate, 2003 ISBN 0-7546-2391-2 (xenotransplantation)
- Two Stars for Peace, iUniverse, 2003 ISBN 0-595-65982-9 (Middle East peace process)
- From Transgender to Transhuman: a Manifesto on the Freedom of Form, Martine Rothblatt, 2011, ISBN 0615489427
- Virtually Human, St. Martin's Press, 2014 ISBN 1-250-04663-7 (artificial intelligence)
- Pixels of Paradise, Martine Rothblatt, 2024, ISBN 979-8-3358-4151-1 (science fiction)

== Filmography ==
Rothblatt is the executive producer of the following films:

- 2B, Transformer Films, 2009. The film is a techno-thriller set in the near-future that deals with the moral questions confronting society following the creation of the world's first posthuman.
- The Singularity Is Near, Exponential Films, 2010. The documentary, based upon Ray Kurzweil's book The Singularity Is Near, is directed by Anthony Waller and stars Pauley Perrette.
- Regarding Us, 2024, an inspirational narrative drama written and directed by David Beck and Jennifer Bobbi, starring Alexandra Grey.
