= Sasha Stiles =

American artist and poet (born 1980)

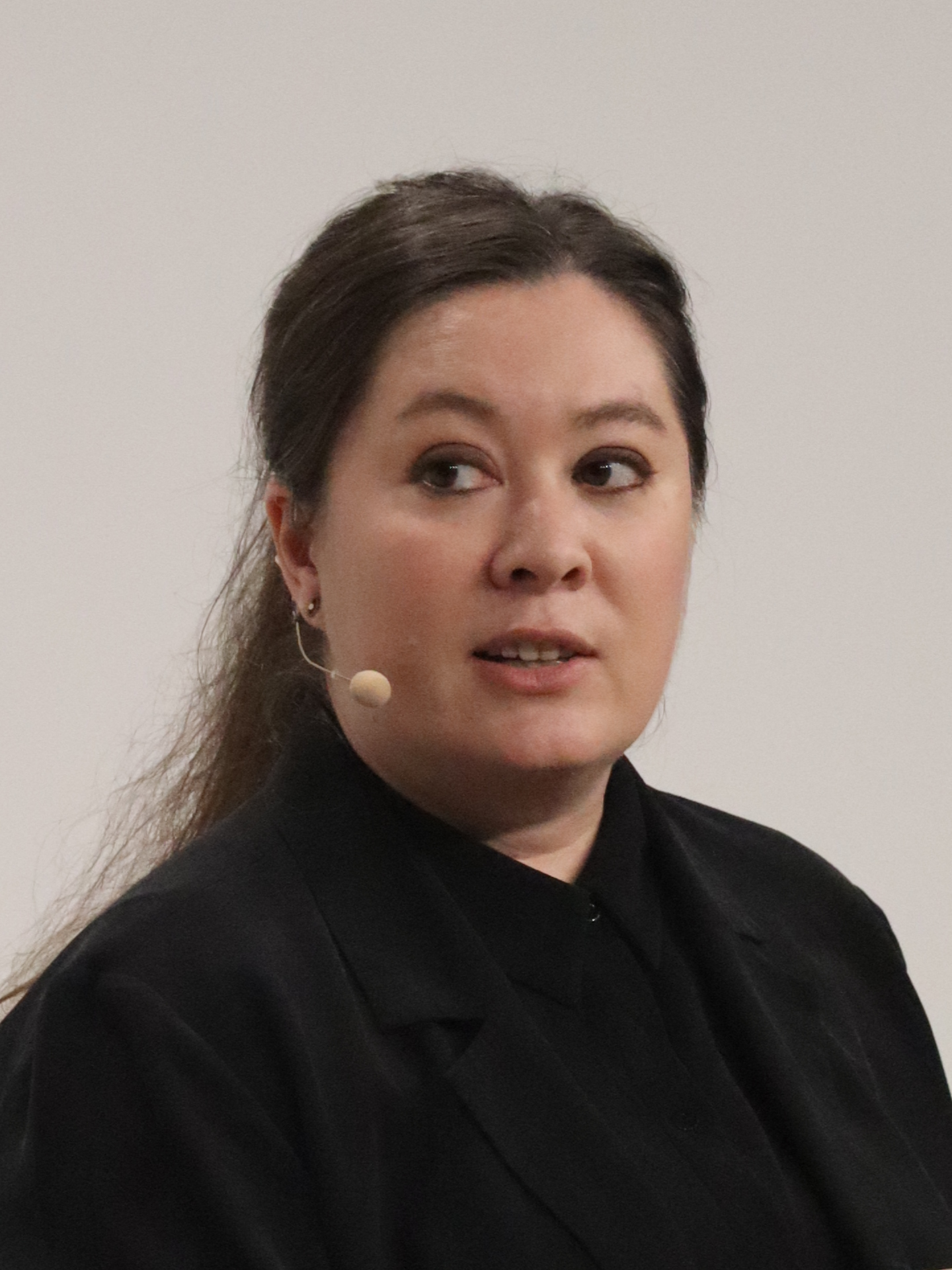
- Stiles in 2025
- Born: 1980 (age 45–46); Pasadena, California, U.S.
- Education: Harvard University; University of Oxford
- Occupations: Artist; poet
- Spouse: Kris Bones

Sasha Stiles (born 1980) is an American artist and poet. After discovering natural language processing, she created the 2021 poetry collection Technelegy through an eponymous AI model, before presenting the 2025–2026 installation A Living Poem at the Museum of Modern Art. In addition to artificial intelligence, binary code and non-fungible tokens have been important aspects of her work.

== Biography ==
Stiles was born in 1980 in Pasadena, California, to documentary filmmaker parents whose work includes Cosmos: A Personal Voyage. She was interested in science fiction during her youth, particularly how they addressed human-machine collaboration and posthumanism. She graduated magna cum laude from Harvard University with a Bachelor of Arts in 2002 and she graduated with high honors from the University of Oxford with a Master of Studies in 2004.

Originally, Stiles's poetry focused on technology. In 2017, she discovered natural language processing, piquing her interest in its ability to process thoughts and words comparably to its human counterparts. Despite lacking a technological background, she managed to channel people like Gwern Branwen, Ross Goodwin, and Allison Parrish as inspirations for her AI work, and in 2019, she started training an AI model named Technelegy. In 2021, Black Spring Press published her poetry collection Technelegy, where she combines AI-generated content produced by the titular AI model with her own traditionally-created work; the AI-generated content was produced by processing Stiles's own poetry onto GPT-2 and GPT-3. She and Technelegy later co-created A Living Poem, which ran at the Museum of Modern Art's Hyundai Card Digital Wall from September 2025 to March 2026.

Stiles also has used non-fungible tokens as a platform for her poetry, having been inspired to go into blockchain by her experiences working with a metaverse exhibition curated by Jess Conatser. She has used Christie's and SuperRare to sell several of her poems as tokenized real-world assets, including Daughter of E.V.E. (Ex-Vivo Uterine Environment), a 2021 single-channel video using freeze-frame shots to hide poetry. In 2021, she co-founded TheVerseVerse (stylized as theVERSEverse), a non-fungible token gallery specializing in poetry. She later created Four Core Texts: Humanifesto and Other Poems, involving four NFT videos of poetry written in looping handwriting and powered by Technelegy.

Stiles uses binary code as an inspiration for her work, citing in part its "quite antagonistic system of a binary 'EITHER / OR'", which she connected to several dichotomies pitting humanity and the present against technology and the future. In 2018, she started Analog Binary Code, where she creates sculptures by arranging objects in binary code ciphers. She also created Cursive Binary, where she combines binary with cursive handwriting, after writing zeros and ones on a steamed wall while showering.

Stiles and the robot BINA48 co-created the 2020 ArtYard exhibition A Valentine for the Future. She was part of the 2021 group exhibition Computational Poetics at the Beall Center for Art and Technology. From February 24 to March 18, 2023, she held her solo show Binary Odes (stylized as B1NARY 0DES) at Annka Kultys Gallery. By 2024, her work had appeared in places such as Gucci storefronts and Times Square billboards. She designed Words Beyond Words, the official poster for Art Basel in Basel 2025.

Stiles is based in Milford, New Jersey, where she lives with her husband, musician Kris Bones. She has also lived in Jersey City and Bucks County, Pennsylvania. She is Kalmyk-American on her mother's side, and she has also announced plans to create a version of Technelegy in her ancestral language Kalmyk.
