= Reynelda Muse =

American television news anchor

- Born: November 16, 1946 (age 79); Ohio, U.S.
- Education: B.A., English, Ohio State University
- Occupation: Television news anchor
- Years active: 1968–1997
- Employer(s): KCNC-TV; CNN
- Spouses: Daniel Muse; Marion Iverson
- Children: 3
- Parent(s): Arthur Allan Ware; Evelyn Cook
- Awards: Emmy Award (1988); Denver Press Club Hall of Fame (1996); Colorado Women's Hall of Fame (1997); Silver Circle of the Heartland Chapter of NATAS (1997); Broadcast Pioneers of Colorado Hall of Fame (1999)

Reynelda Muse (born November 16, 1946) is a former American television news anchor. In 1969 she became the first woman and first African American television news anchor in Colorado, co-anchoring a newscast at KOA-TV (later renamed KCNC-TV) in Denver. In 1980 she was part of the first group of anchors on CNN. She is the winner of many awards, including an Emmy Award, and has been inducted into numerous halls of fame. The Reynelda Muse Television Journalism Scholarship, annually awarded to an African American student majoring in television journalism, was established in her honor by the Colorado Association of Black Journalists.

== Early life and education ==
She was born Reynelda Ware in Ohio, the daughter of Arthur Allan Ware, originally of Pittsburgh, and Evelyn Cook. She has one sister. She attended Ohio State University, graduating with a bachelor's degree in English in 1968.

== Career ==
Fresh out of college and newly married to a University of Denver law student, Muse joined KOA-TV (Channel 4) in 1968 as a general assignment reporter. Her hiring represented a commitment to diversity by the station's new owner, General Electric, but her reception in the newsroom was frosty: the first reporter assigned to work with her told her, "I have a friend who has been trying to get into broadcasting for a long time, but they told him if he was a black woman he would've gotten hired". Muse said, "After we went out, he threw all his notes at me and told me to write the story". She also felt the other newscasters were "protective" of her taking on "hard news" stories. A few months after taking the anchor seat, she decided to assert her identity by wearing an Afro, which was criticized by staff and viewers alike. At one point, she submitted her resignation rather than edit a story that reflected poorly on an employee of one of the station's advertisers. General Electric ordered her rehired immediately.

In 1969 she was promoted to co-anchor a 12:00 noon news program with Clyde Davis. Thus she became the first woman and first African American television news anchor in Colorado. In 1974 Muse and Davis were named co-anchors of the key 5:00 pm and 10:00 pm newscasts.

In 1980 Muse left Channel 4 to become one of the first 12 anchors on CNN in Atlanta, Georgia. Following rehearsals in May, CNN went on the air on June 1, 1980, with Muse co-anchoring the 8:00 pm broadcast segment with Lou Waters. For the next four years, she commuted between Atlanta and her home and family in Denver.

In 1984 Muse returned to Channel 4 to co-anchor the station's new Colorado Evening News program at 6:30 pm with Bill Stuart, a post she filled until November 1997.

In addition to her news anchoring and reporting, Muse appeared on public television as the co-host, with Harry Smith, of the weekly interview show Smith & Muse, which debuted on the KRMA-TV public television station in September 1980. She also hosted the American Skyline series exploring "cultural events, music and art around the United States" for Denver's Pacific Mountain network, and narrated the 1981 Spoonful of Loving' documentary series on childhood development for KRMA-TV. For many years, hers was one of the pre-recorded voices greeting and directing passengers on the underground trains at the Denver International Airport.

In October 1997 Muse announced her decision to retire from television news; her last newscast was on November 26, 1997. She cited changes in programming at the station, which planned to replace the 6:30 pm news program with the game show Hollywood Squares, as influencing her decision. She added that she had become "somewhat disenchanted" with television news:

If you look at recent shows, there's a lot more promotional material, promoting the network shows, promoting this and that. If you look at the actual story content for hard news, it's going down. It's just not as satisfying. This bottom-line economy and market we find ourselves in is perhaps driving these decisions. They're probably cost effective, but I don't think they're good journalism.

After her retirement, Muse took on freelance projects, including doing voice-overs, producing documentaries, and media consulting.

== Other activities ==
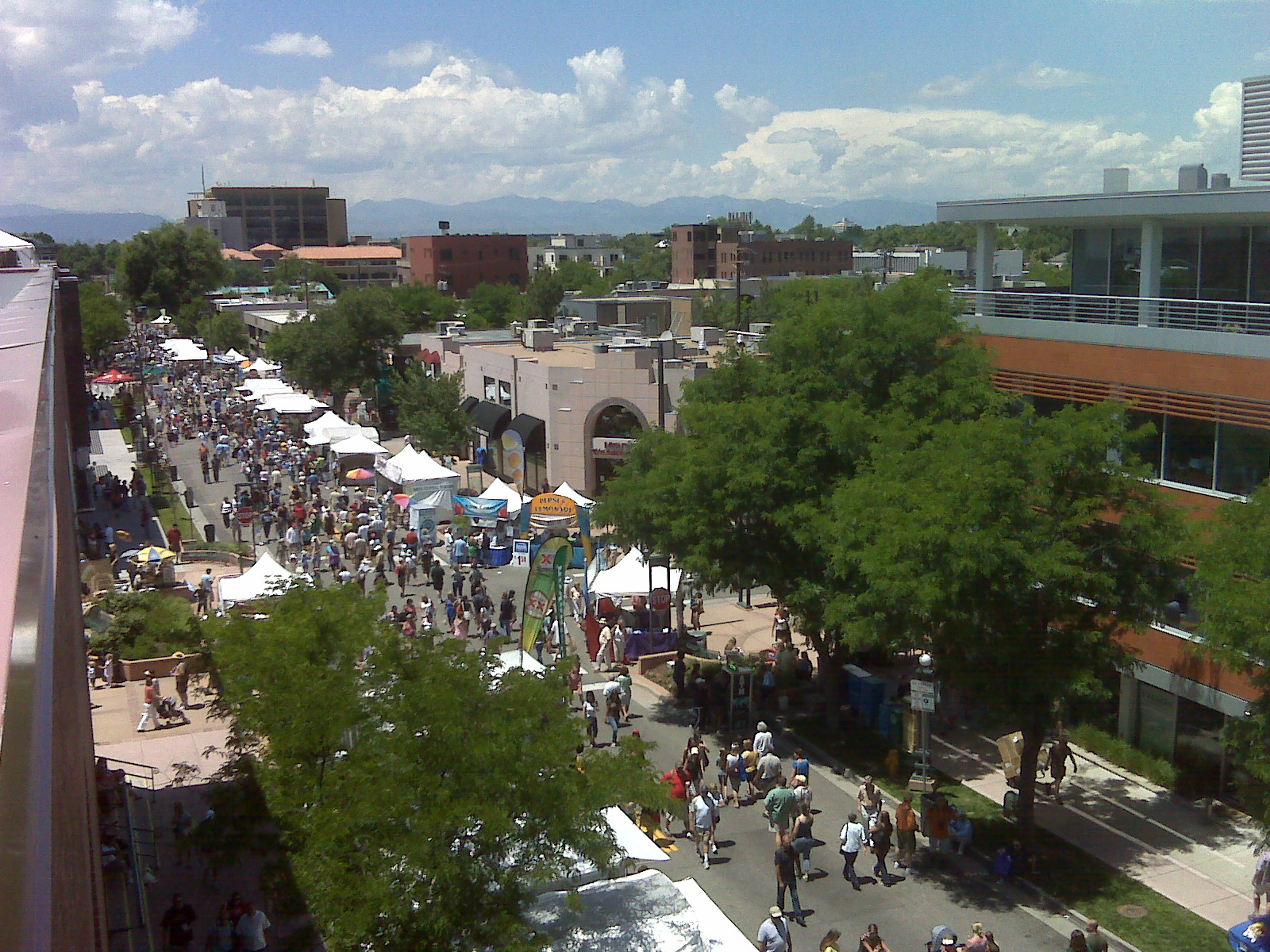
Cherry Creek Arts Festival

Muse maintained a close association with the Denver arts community, being the spokesperson for Arts for Colorado and a member of the advisory boards of the Mayor's Commission on the Arts, Culture and Film; the Cherry Creek Arts Festival; the Metro State College Center for the Visual Arts; the Denver International Film Society; and the black theater company Shadow Theatre. She produced a weekly spot for KCNC-TV called "City Beats" spotlighting the arts.

She was also a guest lecturer at the University of Colorado School of Journalism and other schools.

== Awards and honors ==
Muse won an Emmy Award in 1988 for writing and reporting the documentary Ramses II on KCNC-TV. She received Emmy nominations in 1990, 1993, and 1996.

In 1993 she was the first female recipient of the Broadcaster of the Year award from the Colorado Broadcasters Association. She also won the First Amendment Freedom Prize from the Anti-Defamation League. The Colorado Black Journalists Association gave her their Lifetime Achievement Award in 1993. In 1976 the Colorado Press Women named her their annual Woman of Achievement.

She was inducted into several halls of fame: the Denver Press Club Hall of Fame (1996), the Colorado Women's Hall of Fame (1997), the Silver Circle of the Heartland Chapter of NATAS (1997), and the Broadcast Pioneers of Colorado Hall of Fame (1999).

Fifteen years after her retirement as a news anchor, she was among 75 finalists selected by readers in a Denver Post survey as one of "Colorado's most influential women".

The Reynelda Muse Television Journalism Scholarship was established in her honor in 1998 by the Colorado Association of Black Journalists. The one-year scholarship is awarded annually to an African American student majoring in television journalism at an accredited Colorado college.

== Personal life ==
Reynelda Muse's first husband was Daniel Muse, a fellow Ohioan and University of Denver Law School graduate who served as Colorado Assistant Attorney General from 1975 to 1979 and Colorado Public Utilities Commissioner from 1979 to 1984. They married in 1969 and divorced in 1991. They have three children. From 1974 to 1987 the family lived in the Schulz-Neef House, an historic home built in 1881 in the Whittier neighborhood of Denver. Muse remarried to Marion Iverson in 1997. Following her retirement from television news, Muse relocated to Gary, Indiana, where Iverson was a professor of labor studies at Indiana University Northwest.
