= Cherry Creek, Denver =

Neighborhood in Denver, Colorado

Coordinates: 39.7210°N 104.9498°W

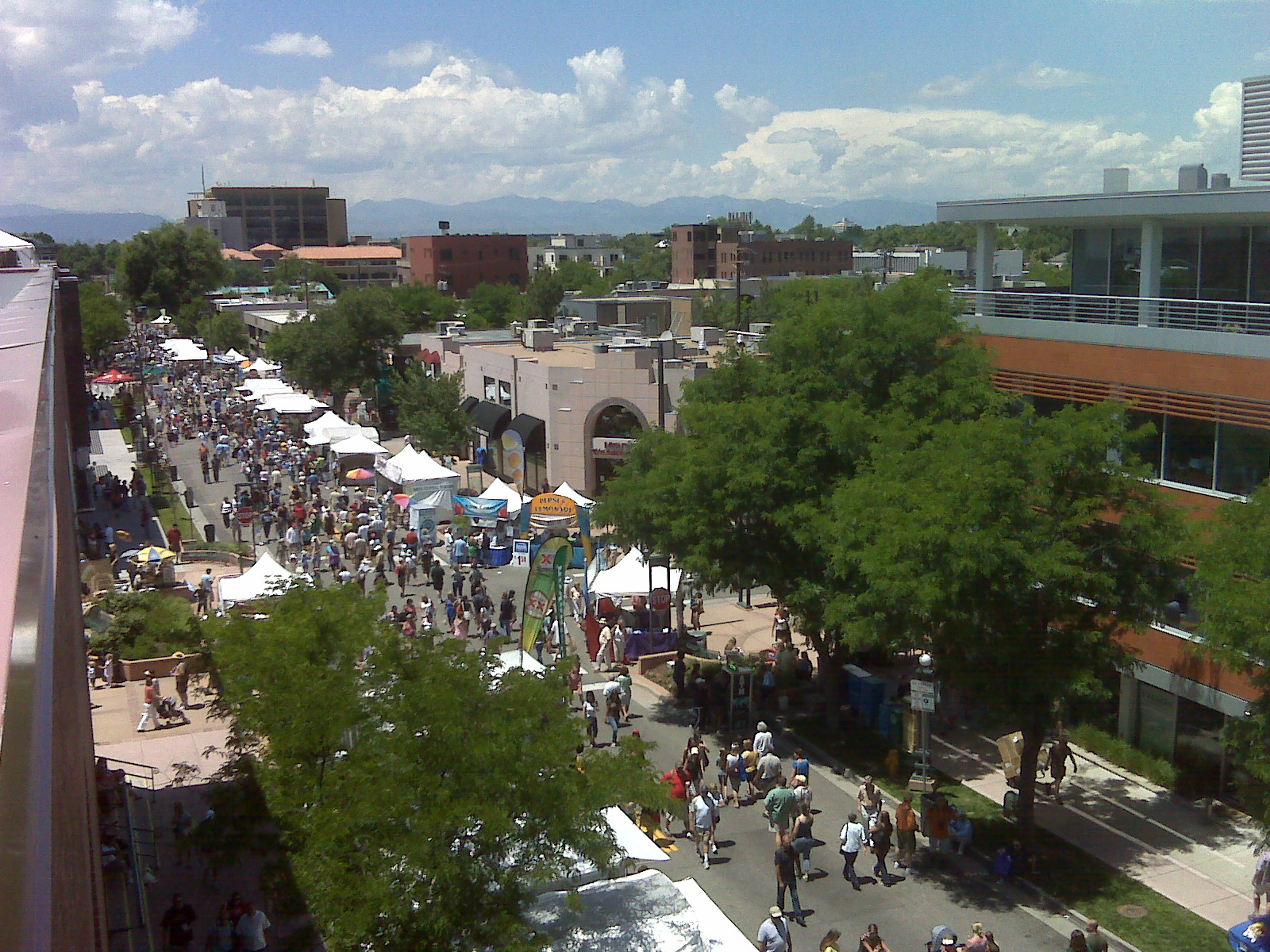
The July 4th Arts Festival in the Cherry Creek commercial district (2009)

Cherry Creek is a neighborhood in Denver, Colorado, in the United States. It has many newer residences mixed in with some of Denver's older homes.

== Geography ==
Cherry Creek neighborhood in this map of Denver's neighborhoods.

The neighborhood is located near the geographic center of the City and County of Denver and is a mixture of dense urban development and tree-lined residential streets. It is bounded by the Cherry Creek on the south, East Sixth Avenue to the north, University Boulevard and Colorado Boulevard (Colorado State Highway 2) on the west and east, respectively. The neighborhood takes its name from the nearby Cherry Creek running along the south side of the neighborhood.

Because Denver was first settled along the confluence of the South Platte River and Cherry Creek, the term "Cherry Creek" is often used in business names, e.g. Cherry Creek Dentistry, to designate their affiliation with the metropolitan Denver area. Many of these businesses are not, however located in the Cherry Creek neighborhood. The Cherry Creek School District which is located in western Arapahoe County, Colorado is also sometimes confused with the Cherry Creek neighborhood because of its name, in spite of it not being located in Denver.

Cherry Creek is serviced by four major traffic arteries making it an easily accessible neighborhood by car. First, Speer Boulevard from Downtown Denver and LoDo becomes East First Avenue in Cherry Creek. Running along the eastern and western boundaries of the neighborhood are University Boulevard and Colorado Boulevard which allow connections from Interstate 25. Lastly, the East Seventh Avenue Parkway skirts the north side of the neighborhood allowing crosstown traffic to get to Cherry Creek. Cherry Creek is also serviced by the Regional Transportation District (RTD) public bus system. It has five main routes that service various parts of the neighborhood. These routes are the 1, 3, 46, and the 3 and the 83 limited.

== Characteristics ==
Two major commercial centers exist in Cherry Creek along the major traffic route of East First Avenue. First is an upscale, enclosed shopping mall, the Cherry Creek Shopping Center, which anchors the neighborhood. Second, the main shopping district of Cherry Creek North is also located along East First, Second, and Third Avenues from University Boulevard to Steele Street with much of the remaining areas of the Cherry Creek neighborhood remaining residential.

Cherry Creek North is a 16 city-block area with a blend of locally owned businesses and nationally recognized brands, including a variety of shops, restaurants, salons, spas and service providers. Fillmore Plaza, located on Fillmore Street between First and Second Avenues, is home to numerous community events including Cherry Creek North Food & Wine in summer and the Cherry Creek Arts Festival.

The Cherry Creek neighborhood is home to the Ross-Cherry Creek local branch of the Denver Public Library. The neighborhood is also home to Manley and Pulaski Parks, the Cherry Creek bike path, and the East Seventh Avenue Parkway, all part of the parks and recreation network of the City of Denver. Additionally, on the last Sunday in April (except Easter), a 5-mile foot race is held on the streets of Cherry Creek and the nearby parks and bike trails called the Cherry Creek Sneak.

== Demographics ==
As of the 2000 Census, there were 5,028 people living in 3,198 households in the Cherry Creek neighborhood. The mean household income was $95,236.93. In 2002, the average home price in Cherry Creek was $692,764.00. It was estimated in 2001 that the neighborhood was home to 15,004 jobs.

== See also ==
- Bibliography of Colorado
- Geography of Colorado
- History of Colorado
- Index of Colorado-related articles
- List of Colorado-related lists
  - List of neighborhoods in Denver
  - List of populated places in Colorado
- Outline of Colorado
