= Oklahoma Contemporary =

Contemporary art museum in Oklahoma

- Established: 1989
- Location: 11 NW 11th Street Oklahoma City, OK 73103
- Coordinates: 35.48°N 97.512222°W
- Type: Contemporary art
- Architect: Rand Elliott Architects
- Website: Website

Oklahoma Contemporary Arts Center is a Contemporary Art Museum in downtown Oklahoma City, Oklahoma. It is a non-profit arts center which was founded in 1989.

Architectural Digest noted in 2020 at the new building's opening: "What was born in 1989 as a modest community arts center on the outskirts of Oklahoma City has since blossomed into the powerhouse art institution Oklahoma Contemporary, which desperately needed a new building to match its bigger and brighter goals...The result is a nearly 54,000-square-foot (5,000 m^{2}) marvel nestled into what’s been dubbed the Innovation District—a hotbed of creativity spanning industries from the arts to aerospace engineering.

== History ==
Oklahoma Contemporary Arts Center, formed at the State Fairgrounds in 1989 as City Arts Center by Christian Keesee and Kirkpatrick Foundation Director Marilyn Myers, is a nonprofit organization providing arts programming and education.

Construction on the new building began in 2018. Rand Elliott Architects designed the new building, dubbing it Folding Light, with intention of the aluminum fins reflecting the Oklahoma sky. It was completed in January 2020 and has 53,916 square feet (5,009.0 m^{2}) of space on four separate floors.

In addition to the 8,000 square feet (740 m^{2}) of galleries for visual art, the 4.6-acre (1.9 ha) grounds also include The Studios, a renovated warehouse that houses ceramics, fiber, painting, printmaking and sculpture classes, the Sculpture Garden and North Lawn lend outdoor space for exhibitions and installations, programs and performances.

The museum's new facilities have been recognized with awards including selection as one of USA Today's Best New Museums, a nomination for an LCD New Cultural Destination and Architecture Masterprize, and winning a Creative Placemaking Award from Paseo Arts Association.

== Exhibits ==
- HOME1947: Sharmeen Obaid Chinoy
- Postcards from Home
- Descendants of the Black 1000: Flight from Oklahoma Black Towns to Canada
- Eva Schlegel: Multiple Voices
- ArtNow: The Soul is a Wanderer
- Patterns of Knowing
- The Art of Food: From the Collections of Jordan D. Schnitzer and His Family Foundation
- Fugitive Speech
- Gonzalo Lebrija: Breve historia del tiempo
- La casa que nos inventamos: Contemporary Art From Guadalajara
- Destination Oklahoma
- Off the Wall
- John Newsom: Nature's Course
- We Believed in the Sun
- Ed Ruscha: OKLA
- Abstract Remix
- Open World: Video Games & Contemporary Art
- Chakaia Booker: Shaved Portions
- Maren Hassinger: Nature, Sweet Nature
- Jen Lewin: Aqueous
- Bright Golden Haze

== See also ==
- List of museums in Oklahoma
