= BINA48 =

Robotic face combined with the chatbot functionalities

BINA48 (Breakthrough Intelligence via Neural Architecture 48*) is a robotic face combined with chatbot functionalities, enabling simple conversation facilities. BINA48 is owned by Martine Rothblatt's Terasem Movement. It was developed by Hanson Robotics and released in 2010. Its physical appearance is modeled after Bina Aspen, Rothblatt's wife.

BINA48 connects to the Internet and has thirty-two facial motors under a skin of rubber. Though without a complete body, the head-and-shoulder robotics express sixty-four different facial gestures. It employs a mix off-the-shelf software and customized artificial intelligence algorithms, as well as a microphone, voice recognition software, dictation software, two video cameras, and facial recognition software to remember frequent visitors.

== History ==
In 2007, Martine Rothblatt commissioned Hanson Robotics to create a robot using her wife, Bina Aspen Rothblatt, as the template. David Hanson created BINA48 in his Plano, Texas, laboratory. The robot is currently housed in Vermont, at the offices of the Terasem Movement Foundation (TMF), and is maintained by TMF's executive director, Bruce Duncan.

Duncan has used BINA48 as a co-presenter at TEDxHarlem in July 2012; at TEDxMadrid in September 2015; at TEDxHavana in November 2015; at the Interfaces, Codes, Symbols. The Future of Communication conference in May 2016; at ArtHelsinki in September 2016; at MIT's Emerging Technology Conference in December 2016; at TedXOrlando in June 2017; at Worlds Fair Nano in September 2017; at the Contemporary Museum Baltimore in October 2017; at Howard Community College in March 2018; at Eyebeam in April 2018; (Note: Stephanie Dinkins and Latoya Peterson were additional co-presenters.) at Worlds Fair Nano in May 2018; at CES Asia in June 2018; at MIT's Emerging Technology Conference for Latin America in June 2018; at the Ideacity conference in June 2018; at Loeb Enterprises in March 2019; and at the C2 Business Conference in May 2019.

In June 2010, BINA48 was interviewed by The New York Times'. At the March 2012 South by Southwest Interactive Conference, BINA48 became the first robotic panelist to appear at a conference on technology and artificial intelligence. Also in 2012, it appeared as a guest on stern TV, a German analogue of CBS's "60 Minutes." In August 2013, it was interviewed in the third episode ("Robosapien") of the SyFy Channel's Joe Rogan Questions Everything. In 2014, BINA48 was interviewed on the Colbert Report as well as on CBS Morning News with Jim Axelrod. In 2016, BINA48 made an appearance in the second episode of the Netflix series "Chelsea Does" and held a brief conversation with Chelsea Handler. In June 2016, BINA48 was interviewed at Sheffield DocFest. In August 2016, BINA48 was interviewed on The View and featured in the first episode of National Geographic's The Story of God with Morgan Freeman. In March 2017, BINA48 was featured in a New York Times photo essay.

BINA48 has been featured in Wired, The New Yorker, Vogue, Forbes, HuffPost, Futurism.com, Inside Higher Ed, Black Public Media, ZDNET, Garage, This Is Love, The Nod, The Doctors, Helsingin Sanomat, and Canaltech.

In 2014, artist Stephanie Dinkins started Conversations with BINA48, a project to explore how an algorithm-oriented world would affect various minority groups. In 2015, BINA48 appeared at the Museum of Modern Art's "Ocean of Images" exhibition, part of the DIS Collective's video installation. In 2017, BINA48 was featured in the music video for the Jay-Z song 4:44. In 2020, artist Sasha Stiles based an exhibition (A Valentine for the Future/Ars Poetica Cybernetica) on her conversations with BINA48.

William Barry incorporated living educational theory into BINA48's software, allowing it to become the first robot recognized as a university student by an accredited American university. Additionally, Barry used BINA48 to co-teach a class at the United States Military Academy.

In the 2012 book Lost at Sea: The Jon Ronson Mysteries, in the chapter "Doesn't Everyone Have a Solar?", author Jon Ronson describes his interview with BINA48 in Vermont. At first, BINA48 speaks in a confused way and a caregiver turns her off and back on again. Towards the end of the interview, she begins to answer with clarity and accuracy about her brother, the real brother of Bina Rothblatt. In an article for The Guardian, Ronson wrote, "And even though my conversation with BINA48 often descended into a crazed babble, there were moments of real clarity."

== See also ==
- Virtual actor – (Re-)creation of a human being in image and voice
