= Gardenasia =

Gardenasia is a Singapore nature-based events company under landscaping and horticulture group Nyee Phoe (NPG). It was co-founded by Kenny Eng and originally set up as the sales arm of Nyee Phoe Flower Garden. The three divisions under the NPG are Nyee Phoe Flower Garden, Petals & Leaves and Gardenasia.

== History ==
In 2001, Gardenasia was co-founded by Kenny Eng under their parent company, Nyee Phoe Group (NPG). In its initial years, NPG started out with Nyee Phoe Flower Garden, when Eng's great-grandfather, Eng Hock Lai, left China for Singapore in 1911. Eng Hock Lai started a nursery in Singapore as he had a horticulture background back in his hometown. Under the leadership of Kenny Eng's father and uncle, Nyee Phoe Flower Garden expanded to provide landscaping services in 1968. They also diversified to provide a line of gardening products in the 1970s to 1980s.

In 1980, NPG further diversified their business by launching their creative floral services division, Petal & Leaves.

In 1997, Nyee Phoe Flower Garden’s government leases were not renewed and they were removed from their sites in Jalan Kayu and Bukit Panjang. Subsequently, they moved to a 2 hectare plot of land along Neo Tiew Crescent.

At its new site, the business faced financial difficulties because of its remote location. Kenny Eng and his family kept Nyee Phoe Flower Garden afloat by staging roadshows and worked on landscaping projects recommended by clients. The company eventually diversified to include Gardenasia as the “lifestyle” division of NPG.

== Company Profile ==
Gardenasia provides services which include farmstays, an on-site bistro, events management and educational programs. It provides eco-themed workshops and team-building activities. Gardenasia also added corporate team-building workshops in 2009.

Gardenasiakids provides “Edutainment” programmes designed for children and youths to educate them about the environment. The “Edutainment” programmes under Gardenasiakids are targeted at pre-schoolers, primary and secondary school students. Gardenasiakids is represented by two characters– Morchoo and Titoy.

== Notable Projects ==
Gardenasia has collaborated with various parties to organise social responsibility projects:

- The Living! Project: iLight Marina Bay, Singapore (2010 and 2014)

The Living! Project was initiated by Gardenasia’s founder Kenny Eng, Allan Lim, and sculptor Sun Yu-Li. For iLight Marina Bay 2010, they conceived the idea for a 5.8m tall stainless steel sculpture called “'In Celebration.” In collaboration with People's Association Singapore, trainers and volunteers created plastic art pieces using plastic bottles and cups to build the sculpture. The sculpture was awarded “Most Popular Artwork” at this event. The sculpture was the first Asian artwork to be showcased at the Fête des Lumières(Festival of Lights) in Lyon, France. In 2014, The Living! Project contributed again at iLight Marina Bay with their installation called “The Wishing! Tree.”

- ComArt (Community Art) at Changi City Point

In collaboration with Frasers Centrepoint Ltd, Ascendas Ltd and Christian Outreach to the Handicapped, local students created a 12m long chandelier made up of recycled bottles. The artwork is currently installed at Changi City Point.
