= Worlds Fair Nano =

American future festival

Worlds Fair Nano is an American future festival whose mission is to let the general public experience the future. Worlds Fair Nano occurs in major cities around the United States.

== History ==
Founded in 2016 as part of an effort to bring a 6-month World's Fair back to the United States, Worlds Fair Nano seeks to revive the spirit of the World's Fair by providing a place where the general public can experience and learn what the future holds.

World's Fair Nano's mission of putting forth a non-BIE effort to bring the World's Fair back to the United States is considered as a long-term effort, since there has not been a full-scale World's Fair in the United States in the past three decades. The most recent World's Fair in the United States was the 1984 Louisiana World Exposition that was held in 1984 in New Orleans, Louisiana. The most recent World's Fair in the entire continent of North America was Expo 86 in the city of Vancouver, British Columbia, Canada. Expo 86 was destined to be the final World's Fair sanctioned by the BIE to be held in all of North America during the 20th century.

A variety of people and organizations have participated in Worlds Fair Nano. Past speakers include Airbnb's former Head of Hospitality Chip Conley, socially advanced AI android BINA48, and SETI's Senior Astronomer Seth Shostak. Past exhibitors include mixed reality company Modal VR which was founded by Atari founder Nolan Bushnell and haptic suit maker HardlightVR

Past Events

The first Worlds Fair Nano took place in New York City on August 6 and 7, 2016. The second fair took place in San Francisco on January 28 and 29, 2017. The third occurred in New York City on September 16 and 17, 2017 The fourth WFN took place in San Francisco on March 10 and 11 at Pier 48. As of summer 2018, the organizers behind Worlds Fair Nano launched a new event series focused on industry applications of artificial intelligence called Ai4.
