= Terasem Movement =

American charitable organization

The Terasem Movement is a group of three organizations based in the United States that focus on extending human life through technology and transhumanism. The name (Tera–Earth, Sem–Seed) was inspired by Earthseed, a fictional religion from the works of Octavia Butler. The movement was founded by Martine Rothblatt and Bina Aspen Rothblatt, and is guided by principles called the "Truths of Terasem". The movement is based in Florida and Vermont.

== Activities ==
=== Terasem Movement, Inc. ===
Terasem Movement, Inc. (TMI), incorporated in 2002, is a charitable organization located in Melbourne Beach, Florida. The eldest of the sister organizations, TMI's mission is to educate the public on the practicality and necessity of greatly extending human life, consistent with diversity and unity, via geoethical nanotechnology and personal cyberconsciousness, concentrating in particular on facilitating revivals from biostasis. The movement focuses on preserving, evoking, reviving, and downloading human consciousness. TMI achieves this objective through its annual workshops and colloquia, safekeeping files within its CyBeRev Project, online publications, grant writing, and other forms of outreach. Through its hosted events, TMI works to ensure the burgeoning technologies are used in a manner that is safe for humans and the environment.

Projects include:

- CyBeRev, Cybernetic Beingness Revival, is part of a multi-decade experiment to test the comparability of a single-person human consciousness with a digital representation of the same person created by personality software that draws upon a database of the original person's digitized interactions, as assessed by expert psychological review.
- Online publications include The Journal of Geoethical Nanotechnology (up to 2014) and The Journal of Personal Cyberconsciousness.
- Terasem Motion InfoCulture produced a screen adaptation of The Singularity Is Near in 2010 in partnership with Ray Kurzweil.

=== Terasem Movement Foundation, Inc. ===
Terasem Movement Foundation, Inc (TMF), incorporated in 2004, is an educational foundation located in Lincoln, Vermont. Its mission is to promote the geoethical use of nano and cybernetic technology for human life extension. TMF conducts educational programs and supports scientific research (LifeNaut Project) and development in the areas of cryonics, biotechnology, and cyber consciousness. The common purpose of all of the Terasem Movement Foundation's projects is to investigate the Terasem Hypotheses.

Current projects include:

- LifeNaut – A long-term research study that offers a free online repository of individual digital reflections/biographical information (Mindfiles) and a place to cryonically store DNA samples (BioFiles) for long-term preservation and eventual re-animation as technology evolves.
- BINA48 – A social robot (Breakthrough Intelligence via Neural Architecture 48—48 exaflops is the speed at which the human brain is purported to compute) that is an early demonstration of the potential for using "mindfiles" for transferring human consciousness information to new forms. TMF encourages public dialog about cyber-consciousness via public presentations and social media. BINA48 was created in 2010 and was based on 100 hours of the speech and memories of Bina Aspen. In 2024, a documentary film about Bina48 was released.
- World Against Racism Museum – an online exhibition designed to educate the public, especially young people, about the fiction of race, the ignorance behind racism, and the need to relate to all people as individuals rather than as racial categories.
- 2B – A feature sci-fi film created in 2009. The script is based upon real science and evolving technologies. The film purports that the 'techno-human' conundrum is the hottest and most controversial topic of this century, and the project is designed to jump-start the conversation about the moral and religious questions raised by the biotech revolution.

=== Terasem Movement Transreligion, Inc. ===
Terasem Movement Transreligion, Inc. (TMT), incorporated in 2004, with locations in Melbourne Beach, FL and Bristol, VT, is the third and youngest of the Terasem projects and is a 501c3 not-for-profit religious organization. Its mission is to build a collective consciousness consisting of joyful immortal extensions of each of its joiners. Though Terasem considers all humans as 'Joiners', after receiving inquiries about how one may formally 'join' Terasem, TMT provided a 'Joinership' application and induction on its site.

== See also ==
- Theta Noir
