= United Therapeutics =

American biotech company based in Maryland

United Therapeutics Corporation

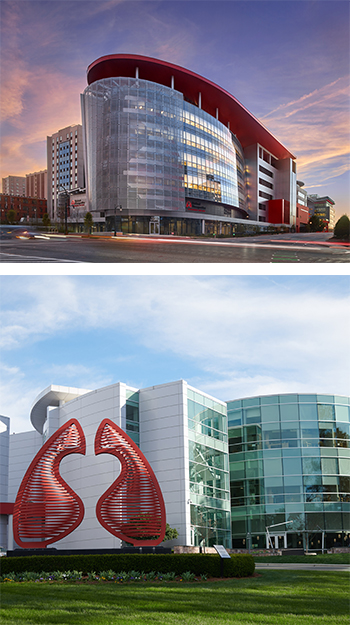
- Co-headquarters and laboratory complex, Silver Spring, Maryland (above), co-headquarters, Research Triangle Park, North Carolina (below)
- Type: Public
- Traded as: Nasdaq: UTHR; S&P 400 component
- Industry: Biotechnology
- Founded: 1996; 30 years ago
- Founder: Martine Rothblatt
- Headquarters: Silver Spring, Maryland and Research Triangle Park, North Carolina, United States
- Revenue: ▲US$3.18 billion (2025)
- Net income: ▲US$1.33 billion (2025)
- Number of employees: 1,168
- Website: unither.com

United Therapeutics Corporation is an American biotechnology company that develops pharmaceuticals and technologies related to organ transplantation, including xenotransplantation. Many of the company's products are focused towards lung disease and organ manufacturing. United Therapeutics is co-headquartered in Silver Spring, Maryland and Research Triangle Park, North Carolina, with additional facilities in Magog and Bromont, Quebec; Melbourne and Jacksonville, Florida; Blacksburg, Virginia; and Manchester, New Hampshire.

== History ==
United Therapeutics was founded in 1996 by Martine Rothblatt, an American lawyer, author, and entrepreneur, who created Sirius XM. In 1994, Rothblatt's young daughter was diagnosed with a fatal orphan disease, pulmonary arterial hypertension (PAH). Rothblatt sold her telecom stock and started the PPH Cure Foundation to fund PAH research.

In 2002, the U.S. Food and Drug Administration (FDA) approved United Therapeutics' drug Remodulin, a prostacyclin vasodilator used to treat PAH. Remodulin provided PAH patients with an alternative to GlaxoSmithKline's Flolan. By 2003, Remodulin annual sales had reached $50 million. By 2010, annual sales were $300 million and United Therapeutics' share price had increased 800 percent from the 1999 initial public offering price.

In 2011, United Therapeutics acquired Revivicor, a company focused on developing genetic biotechnology platforms to provide alternative tissue sources for treatment. With the acquisition of Revivicor, United Therapeutics began the xenokidney program to find alternative sources of organs for patients awaiting a kidney transplant. Xenotransplantation is a potential solution as it possibly could provide a limitless supply of organs.

In 2018, the company acquired SteadyMed, a medical device company developing injectable therapeutic drugs for pulmonary hypertension. Other acquisitions include SynQuest in 1999 and Cooke Pharma in 2000. United Therapeutics has entered numerous licensing agreements and collaborations with companies such as Eli Lilly and Company, DEKA Research & Development, MannKind Corporation, and the National Cancer Institute.

In 2021, United Therapeutics converted to a benefit corporation.

On January 7, 2022, a porcine heart provided by United Therapeutics' Revivicor subsidiary in conjunction with the University of Maryland Medical Center was used in the first pig-to-human transplant operation. The recipient subsequently died on March 8, 2022.

In October 2023, United Therapeutics purchased bioengineering company IVIVA Medical, Inc. for $50 million plus royalties. Sixteen IVIVA employees transferred to United Therapeutics.

In December 2023, United Therapeutics Corporation completed the acquisition of Miromatrix Medical Inc., a biotechnology company that specializes in the development of bioengineered organs composed of human cells.

In 2024, Liquidia sued the FDA over its decision to award a three-year exclusivity period to United Therapeutics.

In 2025, Fortune 1000 listed United Therapeutics at No. 942 among the top 1,000 U.S. companies by revenue. Within the healthcare sector, the company ranked 74th among Fortune 1000 healthcare companies.

== Medicines ==
United Therapeutics products are sold in the U.S. and Canada, and its products are available in Central and South America, Europe, the Middle East, and Asia through various distribution partners. In the U.S., the company has received multiple approvals from the Food and Drug Administration. These cover various strengths and routes of administration for Orenitram, Remodulin, Tyvaso, and Tyvaso DPI, each indicated for the treatment of pulmonary arterial hypertension. Tyvaso and Tyvaso DPI are also indicated for the treatment of pulmonary hypertension associated with interstitial lung disease (PH-ILD). United Therapeutics also markets Adcirca (tadalafil) for the treatment of pulmonary arterial hypertension under a licensing agreement with Eli Lilly and Company.

=== Remodulin ===
In February 2020, the U.S. Food and Drug Administration granted clearance for the Unity Subcutaneous Delivery System for Remodulin Injection, also known as the Remunity pump, allowing the system to be used with drug cassettes that have been prefilled by specialty pharmacies. The Remunity system allows for constant, subcutaneous (under-the-skin) delivery of Remodulin. The Remunity system is indicated for the treatment of pulmonary arterial hypertension in patients older than 22.

=== Unituxin ===
In March 2015, the U.S. FDA approved United Therapeutics' Biologics License Application (BLA) for Unituxin. Unituxin is a monoclonal antibody used as a second-line treatment for children with high-risk neuroblastoma, a rare form of cancer.

=== Tyvaso ===
In May 2022, the U.S. FDA approved United Therapeutics' New Drug Application (NDA) for Tyvaso DPI. Tyvaso DPI is a dry powder inhaler containing treprostinil and is indicated for both PAH and PH-ILD. In 2024, Tyvaso generated $1.62 billion in revenue.

== Research ==
United Therapeutics is advancing a pipeline of research and development projects that includes new indications, formulations, and delivery devices for its existing products. The company's R&D pipeline includes five registration phase studies, primarily in rare lung diseases, and seven preclinical product leads, primarily in organ manufacturing.

In February 2020, United Therapeutics reported that it had successfully completed the INCREASE study of Tyvaso in patients with pulmonary hypertension associated with interstitial lung disease (PH-ILD) and that the study met its primary endpoint of demonstrating improvement in six-minute walk distance (6MWD). The company submitted the INCREASE study results to the U.S. Food and Drug Administration in support of an efficacy supplement to the Tyvaso New Drug Application and received approval on March 31, 2021.

Ongoing clinical trials of new medicines include ADVANCE OUTCOMES (Phase 3) for ralinepag in pulmonary arterial hypertension; a registration study of the Centralized Lung Evaluation System; and TETON 1 and TETON 2 for idiopathic pulmonary fibrosis (IPF).

United Therapeutics is developing a unique type of biopharmaceutical medicinal product known as a manufactured organ. This type of biologic would be transplanted into the patient as a substitute for a failing organ. The company has regenerative medicine products such as these being developed via xenotransplantation, allogenic recellularization, and autologous bioprinting technologies.

In 2021, researchers at New York University used a ThymoKidney xenokidney in the first transplant of a genetically engineered, nonhuman kidney into a brain-dead human body, observing kidney function over 54 hours. Researchers at The University of Alabama at Birmingham used a UKidney xenokidney in a transplant into a brain-dead recipient, observing kidney function over 77 hours.

In 2021, engineers from the company's Unither Bioelectronics subsidiary conducted the first flight of human lungs for transplant from Toronto Western Hospital to Toronto General Hospital. The lungs were successfully transplanted into Alain Hodak, an engineer from Ottawa, Canada.

In 2022, the UHeart xenoheart was used in the first pig heart to living human transplant. The transplanted pig heart had ten genetic modifications to the pig genome.

In 2022, Martine Rothblatt debuted a 3D printed lung scaffold that was what she called one of the "most complex 3D printed objects ever printed." The printed lung scaffold contained 44 trillion voxels that laid out 4,000 kilometers of pulmonary capillaries and 200 million pulmonary alveoli.

== Operations ==
United Therapeutics owns a 415,000-square-foot combination laboratory and office building complex in Silver Spring, Maryland. The facility serves as the company's co-headquarters and is used for commercial manufacturing of active pharmaceutical ingredients and finished dosage form products. United Therapeutics also owns a 380,000-square-foot combination manufacturing plant and office building in Research Triangle Park, North Carolina. The facility serves as the company's co-headquarters and is occupied by clinical research and development, commercialization, logistics, manufacturing, and packaging personnel. Adjacent to its Research Triangle Park complex, United Therapeutics owns a 132-acre site containing approximately 330,000 square feet of building space that is used for research, development and manufacturing related to the company's lung regeneration program. This site is available for future expansion.

United Therapeutics subsidiaries include Lung Biotechnology PBC; Lung Bioengineering Inc.; Miromatrix Medical; United Therapeutics Europe, Ltd.; Unither Biotech Inc., Canada; Unither Pharma, LLC; Unither Telmed, Ltd.; Unither Bioélectronique, Quebec; IVIVA Medical; and Revivicor, Inc. As of December 2023, United Therapeutics had a global workforce of 1,168. On June 1, 2024, United Therapeutics' market capitalization was $12.3 billion.

== Lung Biotechnology PBC ==
United Therapeutics' subsidiary Lung Biotechnology PBC was the first public benefit corporation subsidiary of a publicly traded biopharmaceutical company. Utilizing perfusion, Lung Biotechnology pursued innovative technology that could preserve lungs for transplant by stabilizing lungs that would otherwise be discarded. The objective was to address the acute shortage of transplantable lungs for patients with end-stage lung disease, including PAH.

== Corporate social responsibility ==
In 2020, United Therapeutics established a minimum "living wage" of approximately $75,000 per year for employees, inclusive of incentive pay. Fulltime employees are shareholders of the company through United Therapeutics' long-term incentive programs. United Therapeutics has been recognized as one of the Top 10 Corporate Citizens in the field of U.S. drug manufacturing, along with companies such as Amgen, Johnson & Johnson, and Bristol-Myers Squibb. United Therapeutics was named on Fortune's Best Workplaces in Health Care & Biopharma 2021 (third consecutive year); The Washington Post's Top Workplaces for 2020 (sixth consecutive year); Fortune's Best Small & Medium Workplaces 2020 (third consecutive year); and Fortune's Best Workplaces for Millennials™ 2020. In 2019, United Therapeutics received Women in Technology's Corporate Board Award and was named on Triangle Business Journal's "Best Places to Work List" for the sixth consecutive year. The company was also named to Newsweek's America's Most Responsible Companies list in 2022 and 2023.

United Therapeutics facilities include one Platinum and two Gold LEED certified buildings, as rated by the U.S. Green Building Council, and four net zero buildings located across three states. Innovative, energy-efficient building design, multiple solar arrays, purchase of renewable energy credits (RECs) and carbon offsets, and other green energy technologies have enabled United Therapeutics to achieve a sustainable urban campus. At the time of its construction, United Therapeutics' site net-zero "Unisphere," a 135,000 square foot high-rise office building in Silver Spring, Maryland, was the largest urban office building to be energy positive. Using extensive solar arrays, heat mediating wells, and other leading-edge design technologies, Unisphere generates more energy on site than it consumes.

United Therapeutics has implemented corporate governance best practices ahead of industry peers and the Russell 3000. These include adopting majority voting and proxy access policies, initiating a Board declassification process, and imposing a tighter limit on director outside board membership. The Board of Directors engages with company shareholders multiple times each year to discuss governance and operations priorities. In 2020, 2021, and 2022, United Therapeutics published a comprehensive Corporate Social Responsibility report.

In 2021, United Therapeutics shareholders approved the conversion of the company into a public benefit corporation (PBC). As a PBC, United Therapeutics, while creating value for shareholders, must also consider the best interests of those materially affected by the company's conduct and the specific public benefit that it chooses to adopt in its charter. PBCs like United Therapeutics are intended to produce public benefits and to operate in a responsible and sustainable manner. United Therapeutics public benefit purpose is "to provide a brighter future for patients through (a) the development of novel pharmaceutical therapies; and (b) technologies that expand the availability of transplantable organs."

== Leadership ==
Martine Aliana Rothblatt, founder and chairperson of the board of United Therapeutics, graduated from University of California, Los Angeles, with J.D. and M.B.A. degrees in 1981. In June 2001, she earned a Ph.D. in medical ethics at the Barts and The London School of Medicine and Dentistry, Queen Mary University of London. Rothblatt worked in Washington, D.C., first in the field of communications satellite law, and eventually in life sciences projects like the Human Genome Project. She also served as the CEO of GeoStar and the creator of SiriusXM Satellite Radio. Michael Benkowitz serves as president and chief operating officer; James Edgemond is chief financial officer and treasurer; Paul Mahon is general counsel.
