= 2B (film) =

- Directed by: Richard Kroehling
- Written by: Bob Coen; Eric Nadler; Christian Plummer
- Produced by: Bob Coen; Eric Nadler
- Starring: James Remar; Kevin Corrigan; Jane Kim; Hayley DuMond
- Cinematography: Lisa Rinzler
- Music by: Michael Galasso; Jihae
- Release date: October 2, 2009 (Woodstock)
- Running time: 92 minutes
- Country: United States
- Language: English

2B is a 2009 science fiction film directed by Richard Kroehling and starring James Remar, Kevin Corrigan, Jane Kim, and Hayley DuMond. It is based on the ideas of transhumanism and the technological singularity. The film was released on October 2, 2009 at the Woodstock Film Festival. Produced by Bob Coen and Eric Nadler. It was produced in conjunction with Terasem Media and Films.

== Plot ==
Set in the near future, 2B portrays a familiar decaying world on the cusp of "great transformation and awesome wonders". The story is based upon real science and evolving technologies. When the world's first transhuman, known as a "transbeman", is created by a renegade corporate CEO and bioscientist, the foundations of society's beliefs are threatened in a transhuman world where man merges with technology.

== Cast ==
- James Remar
- Kevin Corrigan
- Jane Kim
- Hayley DuMond
