= I Light Marina Bay =

Light art festival in Singapore

Coordinates: 1°17′04″N 103°51′21″E

i Light Singapore
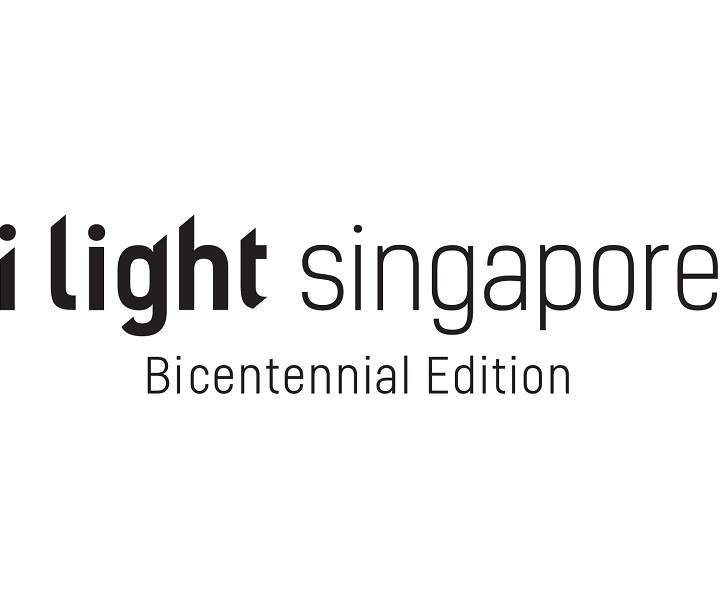
- Official logo
- Genre: Light art festival
- Location: Marina Bay
- Country: Singapore
- Inaugurated: 2010
- Organiser: Urban Redevelopment Authority
- Website: https://www.ilightsingapore.gov.sg/

I Light Marina Bay
- Traditional Chinese: 照亮滨海灣
- Simplified Chinese: 照亮滨海湾
Transcriptions
Standard Mandarin
- Hanyu Pinyin: Zhàoliàng Bīnhǎi Wān
- Bopomofo: ㄓㄠˋ ㄌㄧㄤˋ ㄅㄧㄣ ㄏㄞˇ ㄨㄢ

i Light Singapore (Chinese: 照亮滨海湾) is a sustainable light art festival held in the Marina Bay, Singapore. The festival is organised and presented by the Urban Redevelopment Authority (URA).

i Light Marina Bay was first held in 2010 and the festival was officiated by Singapore's Deputy Prime Minister and Defence Minister Teo Chee Hean on October 15, 2010. Following its success, a second edition was held in 2012 and a third edition was held in 2014. The 2016 festival, themed "In Praise of Shadows" (named after an essay by Junichiro Tanizaki), takes place from 4 to 27 March. The event now takes place annually.

The 'i' in the name is said to allude to the festival's innovative content, the intelligent use of lighting as well as its international line-up of creative talent.

In 2019, the festival was renamed i Light Singapore as an anchor event to commemorate the Singapore Bicentennial.

== 2010 i Light Marina Bay: People, Place and Time ==
The inaugural edition of the festival was held from 15 October to 7 November in 2010 and was originally part of Marina Bay Invitations 2010, a series of events planned to promote Marina Bay as a venue and destination. Curated along the theme People, Place and Time, the festival was intended to serve as the regional platform for the exchange of ideas and technology, artistic expression and public engagement through light art works with intelligent light usage and sustainable use of energy. The festival showcased about 25 dynamic light art installations and sculptures as well as interactive and performance-based art displays by 14 artists from Singapore and 20 international artists. The artworks were arranged in a line around the Marina Bay waterfront promenade to form a Light Walk.

The key highlight of the Light Walk was an installation that consisted of 29 large light artworks of My Public Garden by French light art group, TILT, depicting a whimsical, fantasy garden which adorned The Promontory@Marina Bay.

The inaugural festival was attended by more than 433,000 visitors over the three-week duration, of which approximately 71,031 were international visitors.

=== Switch Off, Turn Up Campaign ===
The "Switch Off, Turn Up" campaign was held in line with the festival. This campaign called for participating properties to make a conscious effort to switch off all non-essential indoor/outdoor lighting and office equipment and turn up air-conditioning temperatures to 24 to 25 °C.

== 2012 i Light Marina Bay: Light Meets Asia ==
The second edition of the light festival, Light Meets Asia, returned in 2012 and ran from 9 March 2012 to 1 April 2012. The theme was "Lights Meet Asia". Installations featured new, emerging and well-known light art artists from countries across Asia including China, Philippines, Japan and Singapore.

The festival showcased 31 environmentally sustainable light installations by multidisciplinary artists, with strong focus on works from Asian artists. 11 of the works were by Singaporeans and 12 were from regional artists.

The 2012 festival attracted 565,000 local and international visitors over the three-week period.

=== Programme ===
A series of fringe activities was arranged throughout the duration of the festival. These included free guided tours, performances, workshops and competitions.

Fringe activities comprised activities such as a weekly weekend Night carnival, with booths selling food and drinks as well as eco-friendly merchandise. The highlight of the Night Carnival was a light painting activity – which involved moving hand-held lights through the air to spell words or sketch symbols that was then captured by using long exposure on a camera.

There were also roving performances of Samba, Rata and Reggae beats by Junk Jam, LED light twirlers, towering LED stilt walkers as well as synchronised kite flying. A photography competition and Low Light Photography Workshop was also held. The festival also included an i Light Symposium where curators, artists and lighting designers had the opportunity to exchange ideas on light culture and architecture.

=== Sustainability ===
Artists were selected for the use of energy-efficient LED lights and/or the incorporation of sustainable, recycleable and/or re-usable materials into their light artworks. Some of these artworks leveraged on alternative sources of energy such as solar, kinetic or wind in order to generate energy for the light installations.

Professional sustainability consultants were also engaged to work with the event partners, artists, contractors and suppliers to ensure that suitable sustainable practices are incorporated to reduce energy use. The total energy usage for all the installations in the 2012 i Light Marina Bay festival was less than 7,000 kWh.

The festival also participated in Earth Hour on 31 March 2012 and all 31 featured artworks were switched off for an hour.

In festival again featured the Switch Off, Turn Up Campaign, extending its reach beyond the Marina Bay precinct, with buildings across the island pledging their support. The campaign saved more than 200,000 kWh, four times the energy saved in 2010. This equates to 100 tonnes of CO_{2} equivalent, enough to generate electricity for 762 4-bedroom HDB flats for three-weeks.

Forty-seven properties that participated 2012's Switch Off, Turn Up campaign, up from 16 properties in 2010:

== i Light Marina Bay 2014: Light+HeART ==
The third edition of i Light Marina Bay, themed Light+HeART, returned to Marina Bay from 7 to 30 March 2014. The festival showcased 28 environmentally sustainable light installations from around the world. To promote an environmentally-responsible behavior for a sustainable future, participating artists incorporated the use of recyclable materials and adopted energy-efficient lighting in the creation of their light art installations.

i Light Marina Bay 2014 attracted a total of 685,000 local and international visitors over the course of the three-week period. The festival again engaged in the "Switch Off, Turn Up" Campaign. In 2014, 52 buildings committed to put in place measures to save energy during the festival period. Key developments involved include Marina Bay Sands, Marina Bay Financial Centre, and One Fullerton. Their participation signified their commitment to play a part in working towards a more sustainable future together. The campaign in 2014 achieved energy savings of 268,890 kWh.

=== Programme ===
i Light Marina Bay 2014 also featured a variety of complementary events and activities, such as free guided tours, educational talks and seminars, sporting activities, bazaars and culinary treats.

== i Light Marina Bay 2016: In Praise of Shadows ==
The fourth edition of i Light Marina Bay, held from 4 to 27 March 2016, featured 25 installations. The 2016 theme, "In Praise of Shadows", challenged the obsession that brighter is better and sought to reframe perceptions of light and sustainability. A one-for-one exchange campaign of used incandescent bulbs for energy efficient LED light bulbs was run at i Light Marina Bay 2016. The "Switch Off, Turn Up" Campaign held since the inception of i Light Marina Bay garnered a greater response from buildings around Marina Bay and beyond, with key developments involved including Marina Bay Sands and Marina Bay Financial Centres.
