= Allison Parrish =

American creative code and poet

- Born: Bountiful, Utah
- Known for: Poetry, software engineering, creative coding, game design, electronic literature
- Notable work: Everyword, Rewordable, Articulations

Allison Parrish is an American poet, software engineer, creative coder, and game designer, notable as one of the most prominent early makers of creative, literary Twitter bots. She was named "Best Maker of Poetry Bots" by The Village Voice in 2016. Parrish has produced a textbook introduction to creative coding in Python, more specifically Processing.py. Parrish holds a BA in Linguistics from UC Berkeley, and a Master of Professional Studies from the Interactive Telecommunications Program (ITP), NYU. She has been a Writer-in-Residence in the English Department of Fordham University, 2014–16, and an Assistant Arts Professor at the ITP since 2016.

== Selected works ==
- Everyword. 2007–2014. A conceptual poetic Twitter bot launched 2007 and later published as a book: Parrish, Allison (2015). Everyword: the book. New York: Instar Books. ISBN 978-0-9904528-5-0. This bot tweeted out an alphabetized list of about 100,000 words, one every 30 minutes. Instead of a definition, the entry for that word contains the social media analytics of that tweet. @everyword was one of the first bots to have an ultimate telos, or aim, as well as a clear structure, and a metanarrative as the reactions to each word were substituted for a definition and use of the word.
- Frankenstein-Genesis, word vectorization, a machine-readable representation mixes two paragraphs from "Frankenstein" and the Bible.
- Rewordable. 1999–2000. With collaborators Adam Simon and Tim Szetela.
- Parrish, Allison (2018). Articulations. Denver: Counterpath. ISBN 978-1933996653. The book uses an algorithm to draw lines between similar linguistic elements of public domain poetry.

== Awards ==
Allison Parrish won The Maverick Award from the Electronic Literature Organization in 2024.
