= Cherry Creek Arts Festival =

Annual festival held in Denver, Colorado

Coordinates: 39°43′9.9″N 104°57′12.3″W

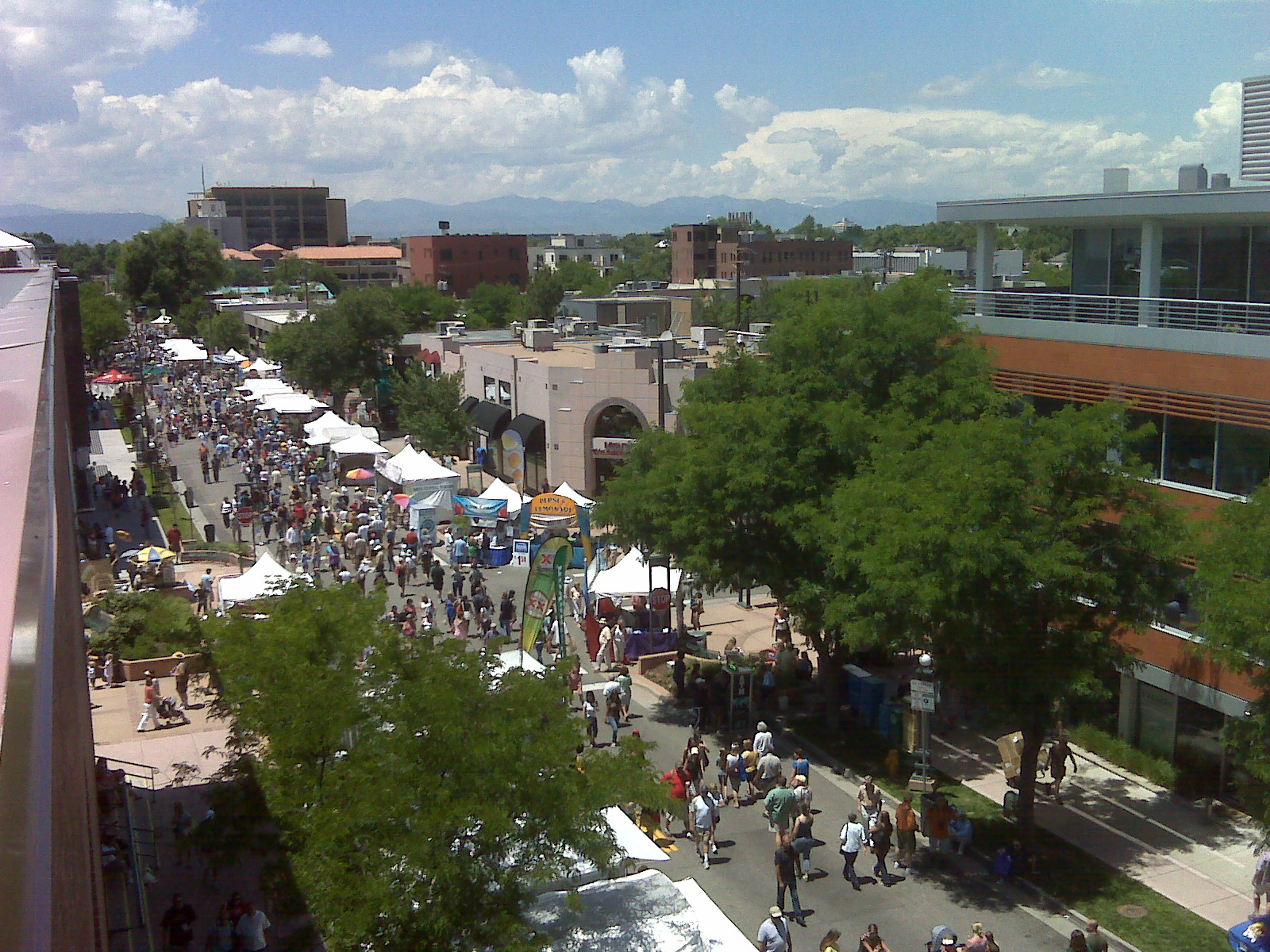
Arts Festival at Cherry Creek

The Cherry Creek Arts Festival is an annual festival held in Denver, Colorado, during the first weekend of July, usually Fourth of July weekend. The inaugural Cherry Creek Arts Festival began in 1991.

== History ==
The first president and executive director of the Arts Festival was Bill Charney who originally presented the Arts Festival concept to the Cherry Creek Chamber of Commerce (then the Cherry Creek Commerce Association) Board of Directors. At that meeting, the leadership of the Cherry Creek business community committed $15,000 in seed money, and a group of volunteers to assist Charney as an "Organizing Committee". Currently, Tara Brickell serves as the festival's executive director.

The COVID-19 pandemic caused 2020's cancellation. The 30th was deferred to September 2021.

== Description ==
The Cherry Creek Arts Festival is a year-round 501(c)(3) non-profit arts services organization that presents an award-winning annual civic event. For three days during early July, the nation's #1 outdoor Arts Festival (as ranked by four independent industry publications) is presented in Denver's Cherry Creek North neighborhood. With an attendance of 350,000+, the Arts Festival features over 232 of the nation's visual artists; seven performance stages presenting a broad range of entertainment; a volunteer program with over 1,000+ volunteers working in 23 different committees; and a sponsorship program with a 91% retention rate.

The [Cherry Creek Arts Festival] continues to be a vital part of Denver's annual cultural and economic landscape, contributing approximately $20,000 annually to local non-profits and $250,000 in tax revenues, CCAF's overall economic impact is $11–13 million each year. The Arts Festival is hosted by the Cherry Creek North Business Improvement District and receives no commission for the sale of artwork. CCAF is entirely dependent upon donations, sponsorships and grants, in addition to support from the City and County of Denver and the SCFD. On an individual level, the public can support the Arts Festival by purchasing official Cherry Creek Arts Festival posters and merchandise for sale throughout the year, as well as refreshments for sale on-site. Individuals and businesses are also invited to participate in the Arts Festival's "Festival Club" and Donor programs.

Four full-time employees fulfill the agency's educational mission during the year through art education and outreach programs that touch 20,000 Coloradans annually. Collectively known as Arts in Action, this includes the Mobile Art Collection, the Alliance Project and the Artist in Residence program. It also sponsors lesson plans for teachers that fulfill Colorado Arts Education and National Arts Standards.
