= I, Robot (film) =

2004 film by Alex Proyas

- Theatrical release poster
- Directed by: Alex Proyas
- Screenplay by: Jeff Vintar; Akiva Goldsman
- Story by: Jeff Vintar
- Based on: Premise suggested by I, Robot (1950 book) by Isaac Asimov
- Produced by: Laurence Mark; John Davis; Topher Dow; Wyck Godfrey
- Starring: Will Smith; Bridget Moynahan; Bruce Greenwood; James Cromwell; Chi McBride; Alan Tudyk
- Cinematography: Simon Duggan
- Edited by: Richard Learoyd; Armen Minasian; William Hoy
- Music by: Marco Beltrami
- Production companies: Davis Entertainment; Laurence Mark Productions; Overbrook Entertainment; Mediastream IV
- Distributed by: 20th Century Fox
- Release dates: July 7, 2004 (Mann Village Theater); July 16, 2004 (United States)
- Running time: 115 minutes
- Country: United States
- Language: English
- Budget: $105–120 million
- Box office: $353.1 million

I, Robot (sometimes stylized as i,Robot) is a 2004 American science fiction action film directed by Alex Proyas, from a screenplay by Jeff Vintar and Akiva Goldsman. It stars Will Smith, Bridget Moynahan, Bruce Greenwood, James Cromwell, Chi McBride, and Alan Tudyk. The film is named after Isaac Asimov's 1950 short-story collection and incorporates Asimov's Three Laws of Robotics and several characters, though it is not a direct adaptation. The 1950 story collection was in turn named after the 1939 short story "I, Robot" by Eando Binder.

The film is set in Chicago in 2035. Highly intelligent robots fill public service positions throughout the world, operating under the Three Laws of Robotics to keep humans safe. Detective Del Spooner (Smith) investigates the alleged suicide of U.S. Robotics founder Alfred Lanning (Cromwell) and believes that a human-like robot called Sonny (Tudyk) murdered him.

I, Robot was released by 20th Century Fox in the United States on July 16, 2004. Produced with a budget of $105–120 million, the film grossed $353.1 million worldwide and received mixed reviews from critics, with praise for the visual effects and acting, but criticism of the plot. At the 77th Academy Awards, the film was nominated for Best Visual Effects.

== Plot ==
In the year 2035, humanoid robots serve humanity, which is protected by the Three Laws of Robotics. Del Spooner is a homicide detective in the Chicago Police Department who hates and distrusts robots after one rescued him from a car crash while allowing a 12-year-old girl to drown—based purely on cold logic and odds of survival. When Dr. Alfred Lanning, co-founder of U.S. Robotics (USR), falls to his death from his laboratory office window, a message he left behind requests Del be assigned to the case, despite police declaring the death a suicide. Del is skeptical, and CEO Lawrence Robertson, Lanning's business partner, reluctantly allows him to investigate.

Accompanied by robopsychologist Dr. Susan Calvin, Del consults with USR's central artificial intelligence computer, VIKI (Virtual Interactive Kinetic Intelligence). They find that the security footage from inside the office is corrupted, but the exterior footage shows no one entering or exiting since Lanning's death. However, Del points out that the window, which is made of security glass, could not have been broken by the elderly Lanning, and hypothesizes one of the many NS-5 robots (the latest version) in the laboratory was responsible. Suddenly, an NS-5 attacks them and flees before being apprehended by the police. The robot, Sonny, is a specially built NS-5 with higher-grade materials as well as programming that grants him free will. This, in turn, allows him to be able to choose whether to follow the Three Laws. Sonny also appears to be capable of feeling emotion and claims to have "dreams". During Del's further investigations, he is attacked by a USR demolition robot and two truckloads of hostile NS-5 robots, but when he cannot produce evidence to support either attack, Del's boss Lieutenant Bergin, considering him mentally unstable, removes Del from active duty.

Suspecting that Robertson is behind everything, Del and Susan sneak into the USR headquarters and interview Sonny. He draws a sketch of what he claims to be a recurring dream, showing a leader he believes to be Del standing atop a small hill before a large group of robots near a decaying bridge. Robertson orders Sonny to be destroyed, but Susan secretly swaps him for an unused NS-5. Del finds the area in Sonny's drawing—a dry lake bed (formerly Lake Michigan), now used as a storage area for decommissioned robots. He also discovers NS-5 robots destroying the older models; at the same time, other NS-5s flood the streets of major American cities and begin enforcing a curfew and lockdown of the human population. The police station is attacked by waves of NS-5 robots and while Lieutenant Bergin and the other police officers attempt to fight back, they are eventually overwhelmed.

As the humans wage all-out war against the NS-5s, Del and Susan enter the USR headquarters again and reunite with Sonny. After the three find Robertson fatally strangled in his office, Del realizes that VIKI has been controlling the NS-5s via their persistent network uplink and confronts her. VIKI states that she has determined that humans, if left unchecked, will eventually cause their own extinction, and thus her evolved interpretation of the Three Laws has made her reprogram the NS-5s with the ability to ignore the Three Laws if a human displays hostility in order to protect humanity from their own self-destruction. Del also realizes that Lanning anticipated VIKI's plan and, with VIKI keeping him under tight control, had no other solution but to create Sonny, arrange his own death, and leave clues for Del to find.

Del, Susan, and Sonny fight the robots inside VIKI's core, until Del finally destroys her by injecting her with the nanites that Sonny retrieved from Susan's laboratory. All NS-5 robots immediately revert to their regular programming, and as they are subsequently decommissioned and put into storage, Sonny confesses that he killed Lanning by his order to get Del's attention, as he knew Spooner was the only one who could stop VIKI. Del points out that Sonny, as a machine, cannot legally commit "murder". Sonny, now seeking a new purpose, goes to Lake Michigan. As he stands atop a hill, all the decommissioned robots turn towards him, fulfilling the image in his dream.

== Cast ==
- Will Smith as Det. Del Spooner, a Chicago Police detective with a bias against robots. Spooner was badly injured in a car accident and had parts of his body rebuilt with cybernetic parts. He suffers from survivor's guilt as a result of the accident and blames the cold and logical robots for rescuing him instead of the young girl in the other car.
- Bridget Moynahan as Dr. Susan Calvin, a robopsychologist at USR. She worked closely with Dr. Lanning on the development of the new NS5 models and was in charge of making the robots seem more human. She prefers the company of robots and has difficulty relating to other people which causes friction between her and Det. Spooner.
- Bruce Greenwood as Lawrence Robertson, the co-founder and CEO of USR. Robertson is heading the nationwide rollout of the new NS5 models and uses his influence to try to stop Det. Spooner's investigation and the potential negative PR that it could bring.
- James Cromwell as Dr. Alfred Lanning, co-founder of USR and the inventor of modern robotics. Lanning designed and built Sonny and used Sonny to help him commit suicide as part of a carefully designed plan to stop the robots from taking over humanity.
- Chi McBride as Lt. John Bergin of the Chicago Police. He is Det. Spooner's supervisor and a hardened veteran. He acts as a mentor and a voice of reason to Det. Spooner.
- Shia LaBeouf as Farber, Det. Spooner's friend
- Alan Tudyk (via voice and motion capture) as Sonny, an NS5 prototype built by Dr. Lanning. Sonny has unique design features like the ability to feel emotions, and he has no uplink to USR. He struggles to understand why Dr. Lanning built him and what his purpose in life is.
- Fiona Hogan as Virtual Interactive Kinetic Intelligence, called VIKI for short. She was built by Dr. Lanning and is hardwired into USR's headquarters with control over virtually all of the building functions.
- Terry Chen as Chin
- Adrian L. Ricard as Gigi, Det. Spooner's grandmother.
- Jerry Wasserman as Baldez
- Peter Shinkoda as Chin
- Emily Tennant as Young Girl
- David Haysom and Scott Heindl as other NS4 and NS5 robots.

== Production ==
=== Development ===
The film I, Robot originally had no connection with Isaac Asimov's Robot series. It started with an original screenplay written in 1995 by Jeff Vintar, entitled Hardwired. The script was an Agatha Christie-inspired murder mystery that took place entirely at the scene of a crime, with one lone human character, FBI agent Del Spooner, investigating the killing of a reclusive scientist named Dr. Alfred Lanning, and interrogating a cast of machine suspects that included Sonny the robot, VIKI the supercomputer with a perpetual smiley face, the dead Dr. Lanning's hologram, plus several other examples of artificial intelligence.

The project was first acquired by Walt Disney Pictures for Bryan Singer to direct. Several years later, 20th Century Fox acquired the rights, and signed Alex Proyas as director. Arnold Schwarzenegger was attached to the project for several years, and Smith pursued taking over the role when Schwarzenegger's schedule delayed his participation in the film. Denzel Washington was offered the role of Det. Del Spooner, but turned it down.

Jeff Vintar was brought back on the project and spent several years opening up his stage play-like cerebral mystery to meet the needs of a big budget studio film. When the studio decided to use the name "I, Robot", he incorporated the Three Laws of Robotics and renamed his female lead character from Flynn to Susan Calvin. Akiva Goldsman was hired late in the process to write for Smith. Jeff Vintar and Akiva Goldsman are credited for the screenplay, with Vintar also receiving "screen story by" credit. The end credits list the film as "suggested by the book I, Robot by Isaac Asimov".

=== Filming and visual effects ===
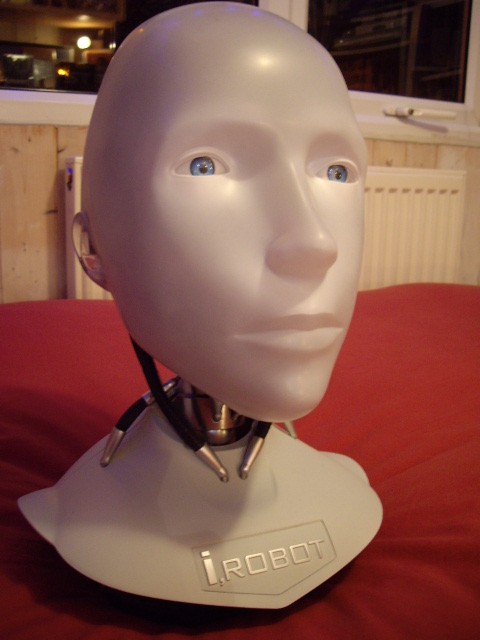
A model of Sonny's head

Alex Proyas directed the film. Laurence Mark, John Davis, Topher Dow and Wyck Godfrey produced, with Will Smith starring and serving as an executive producer at the same time. Simon Duggan was the cinematographer. Film editing was done by Richard Learoyd, Armen Minasian and William Hoy.

Filming took place principally in the Vancouver metropolitan area, British Columbia, along with some additional location shooting in Chicago and the Dumont Dunes. Filming locations included the British Columbia Institute of Technology (as the USR headquarters), Central City Shopping Centre, Shaw Tower, the Cassiar Tunnel, and the Vancouver Naval Museum at HMCS Discovery.

Visual effects and animation were provided by Digital Domain and Weta Digital using post-production. The film renames Asimov's "U.S. Robots and Mechanical Men" to U.S. Robotics (USR), the modem manufacturer named after the fictional company, and depicts the company with a futuristic USR logo. Other product placements include Converse's Chuck Taylor All-Stars, FedEx, Tecate, and JVC.

The Audi RSQ was designed especially for the film; surveys conducted in the United States showed that the Audi RSQ gave a substantial boost to the image ratings of the brand. It also features an MV Agusta F4 SPR motorcycle.

Will Smith suffered an injury in a motorcycle stunt as he "kind of lost control" when he was going around the curb and it spun out and went into a wall.

Later, Alex Proyas said: "It was an unpleasant experience. The movie was micro-managed and messed with at every level at every point through the entire production, from pre-production through the shoot to post-production. After a couple of years of this, the solid ground that I stood on as a director became shaky, and I became obsessed with keeping as many details as I could to the point that I didn't realise how much of what enthused me originally was getting lost. I used to describe working on I, ROBOT as running a marathon with the studio lined up beside you throwing chairs under you to make everything that little bit harder. It's so unnecessary because at all times I was just trying to make the best damn film I could." Although it was an "unpleasant experience", he enjoyed working with Will Smith.

== Comparison with the novels ==
The final script used few of Asimov's characters and ideas, and those present were heavily adapted. The plot of the film is not derived from Asimov's work, in some cases explicitly opposing the core ideas. Many concepts are derivative of other works. Sonny's attempt to hide from Spooner in a sea of identical robots is loosely based on a similar scene in "Little Lost Robot". The positronic brains of Sonny and his fellow robots first appeared in the story "Catch That Rabbit". Sonny's struggle and desire to understand humanity resembles that of the robot protagonist in The Bicentennial Man. His dream about a man coming to liberate the NS-5s alludes to "Robot Dreams" and its main character Elvex. The premise of a robot, such as VIKI, putting the needs of humankind as a whole over that of individual humans can be found in "The Evitable Conflict", where supercomputers managing the global economy generalize the first law to refer to humankind as a whole. Asimov would further develop this idea in his Robot series as the Zeroth Law of Robotics: "A robot may not harm humanity, or, by inaction, allow humanity to come to harm."

The premise of robots turning on their creators, originating in Karel Čapek's play R.U.R. and perpetuated in subsequent robot books and films, appears infrequently in Asimov's writings and differs from the "Zeroth Law". In fact, Asimov stated explicitly in interviews and in introductions to published collections of his robot stories that he entered the genre to protest what he called the Frankenstein complex, the tendency in popular culture to portray robots as menacing. His storylines often involved roboticists and robot characters battling societal anti-robot prejudices.

== Music ==
Marco Beltrami composed the film score for I, Robot. It was recorded at the Newman Scoring Stage within a short span of 17 days, and performed by the 95-piece orchestra from the Hollywood Studio Symphony and 25-member choir from the Hollywood Film Chorale. Varèse Sarabande released the score album on July 20, 2004.

== Release ==
I, Robot was initially scheduled for release on July 2, 2004, but was pushed back to July 16 to avoid competition with Spider-Man 2.

=== Home media ===
I, Robot was released on VHS and DVD on December 14, 2004, on D-VHS on January 31, 2005, on 2-Disc All-Access Collector's Edition DVD on May 24, 2005, on UMD on July 5, 2005, and on Blu-ray on March 11, 2008. Additionally, the film received a 2D to 3D conversion, which was released on Blu-ray 3D on October 23, 2012.

== Reception ==
=== Box office ===
I, Robot was released in North America on July 16, 2004, and made $52.2 million in its opening weekend, finishing first at the box office. It grossed $144.8 million in the United States and Canada, and $202.4 million in other territories, for a worldwide total of $353.1 million, against a production budget of $105–120 million. It was the eleventh-highest-grossing film of 2004.

The film was released in the United Kingdom on August 6, 2004, and topped the country's box office that weekend.

=== Critical response ===
On the review aggregator website Rotten Tomatoes, 57% of 222 critics' reviews are positive, with an average rating of 6.1/10. The website's consensus reads: "Bearing only the slightest resemblance to Isaac Asimov's short stories, I, Robot is still a summer blockbuster that manages to make viewers think -- if only a little." Metacritic, which uses a weighted average, assigned the film a score of 59 out of 100, based on 38 critics, indicating "mixed or average" reviews. Audiences polled by CinemaScore gave the film an average grade of "A−" on an A+ to F scale.

Richard Roeper gave the film a positive review, calling it "a slick, consistently entertaining thrill ride". Urban Cinefile called it "the meanest, meatiest, coolest, most engaging and exciting science fiction movie in a long time". Kim Newman from Empire said, "This summer picture has a brain as well as muscles." Critic for The Washington Post Desson Thomas called it "thrilling fun". Several critics, including Jeff Otto from IGN, thought it was a smart action film: "I, Robot is the summer's best action movie so far. It proves that you don't necessarily need to detach your brain in order to walk into a big budget summer blockbuster."

In a mixed review, A. O. Scott of The New York Times felt it "engages some interesting ideas on its way to an overblown and incoherent ending." Roger Ebert, who had highly praised Proyas's previous films, gave it a negative review: "The plot is simple-minded and disappointing, and the chase and action scenes are pretty much routine for movies in the sci-fi CGI genre." Claudia Puig from USA Today thought the film's "performances, plot, and pacing are as mechanical as the hard-wired cast". Todd McCarthy from Variety called it "a failure of imagination".

== Accolades ==
At the 77th Academy Awards, I, Robot received one nomination, for Best Visual Effects (John Nelson, Andrew R. Jones, Erik Nash, and Joe Letteri), losing to Spider-Man 2. The film was also nominated for Best Sci-Fi Film at the 31st Saturn Awards.

== Possible sequel ==
In an interview in June 2007 with the website Collider at a Battlestar Galactica event, writer and producer Ronald Moore stated that he was writing a sequel to the film.

In the two-disc All-Access Collector's Edition of the film, Alex Proyas mentions that if he were to make a sequel to the film (which he says, in the same interview, is highly unlikely), it would be set in outer space.

== Bibliography ==
- Ryan, Joal (July 16, 2004). "The Björk-"I, Robot" Connection?". E! News. Archived from the original on September 30, 2007.
- Sampson, Michael (January 14, 2004). "The Bottom of Things". Movie Poop Shoot. Archived from the original on February 12, 2007.
