= Wendey Stanzler =

American film editor

Wendey Stanzler is an American film editor and television director since 1985. She was co-editor and associate producer of Michael Moore's documentary Roger & Me, in 1989. She also co-edited Moore's only fiction film, Canadian Bacon (1993). Stanzler was hired as an editor for Sex and the City and went on to become a guest director during the final season of the series. Stanzler has also edited for the series, Ed and Now and Again and the romantic comedy film Gray Matters (2007), directed by Sue Kramer, starring Heather Graham, Tom Cavanagh and Bridget Moynahan.

She has directed several episodes of Grey's Anatomy, Desperate Housewives, The Middle and Ugly Betty, all on ABC as well as The Vampire Diaries, Pretty Little Liars, Parks and Recreation among other series. Stanzler was producer and director on the first season of the CW series 90210 in 2008–2009. In 2011, she directed the pilot episode of the ABC Family series The Nine Lives of Chloe King. In 2015, she began directing episodes of You're the Worst in its second season and in the third season, she became a co-executive producer and directed the season's episodes with series creator Stephen Falk.

She won the American Cinema Editors' Eddie Award twice: in 2004 for the Sex in the City episode "American Girl in Paris, part 2" and in 1990 for Roger & Me.

In 2003 and 2004, Stanzler was nominated for a Primetime Emmy Award for her editing work on Sex and the City. Stanzler won a Children’s & Family Emmy Award in 2022 for Outstanding Directing for a Single-Camera Program for the Mysterious Benedict Society.

== Selected television directing credits ==
- Sex and the City (1998)
  - Episode 6.14 "The Ick Factor"
- Monk (2002)
  - Episode 5.16 "Mr. Monk Goes to the Hospital"
  - Episode 6.04 "Mr. Monk and the Bad Girlfriend"
- Desperate Housewives (2004)
  - Episode 2.11 "One More Kiss"
  - Episode 2.21 "I Know Things Now"
  - Episode 3.03 "A Weekend In the Country"
  - Episode 3.08 "Children and Art"
  - Episode 3.20 "Gossip"
- Grey's Anatomy (2001)
  - Episode 1.09 "Who's Zoomin' Who?"
  - Episode 2.04 "Deny, Deny, Deny"
  - Episode 2.10 "Much too Much"
  - Episode 2.19 "What Have I Done To Deserve This?"
- Love Monkey (2006)
  - Episode 1.05 "The Window"
- Six Degrees (2006)
  - Episode 1.03 "A New Light"
- Ugly Betty (2006–2010)
  - Episode 1.14 "I'm Coming Out"
  - Episode 2.5 "A League of Their Own"
  - Episode 2.17 "The Kids Are Alright"
  - Episode 4.4 "The Wiener, the Bun and the Boob"
- Men in Trees (2006)
  - Episode 1.13 "History Lessons"
  - Episode 2.17 "New Dogs, Old Tricks"
- Private Practice (2007)
  - Episode 1.09 "In Which Dell Finds His Fight"
- Samantha Who (2007)
  - Episode 2.1 "So I Think I Can Dance"
- Big Shots (2007)
  - Episode 1.7 "Who's Your Daddy"
- 90210 (2008)
  - Episode 1.2 "The Jet Set"
  - Episode 1.10 "Games people plays"
  - Episode 1.13 "Love Me or Leave Me"
- Dollhouse (2009)
  - Episode 2.6 "The Left Hand"
- The Middle (2009–2010)
  - Episode 1.7 "The Scratch"
  - Episode 2.1 "Back to School"
- The Vampire Diaries (2011–2012)
  - Episode 2.17 "Know Thy Enemy"
  - Episode 3.4 "Disturbing Behavior"
  - Episode 3.11 "Our Town"
  - Episode 4.6 "We All Go a Little Mad Sometimes"
- Glee (2013)
  - Episode 4.21 "Wonder-ful"
  - Episode 5.05 "The End of Twerk"
- Pretty Little Liars
  - Episode 1.05 "Reality Bites Me"
  - Episode 2.18 "A Kiss Before Lying"
  - Episode 3.08 "Stolen Kisses"
  - Episode 4.06 "Under The Gun"
- Arrow
  - 1.12: "Vertigo" (2013)
  - 2.5: "League of Assassins" (2013)
  - 2.13: "Heir to the Demon" (2014)
  - 3.2: "Sara" (2014)
  - 3.22: "This is Your Sword" (2015)
  - 4.3: "Restoration" (2015)
  - 5.20: "Underneath" (2017)
  - 6.11: ""We Fall" (2018)
- The Flash
  - 1.19: "Who Is Harrison Wells?" (2015)
- Kevin (Probably) Saves the World
  - Episode 1.06 "Rocky Rad" (2017)
- Future Man
  - Episode 1.11 "Beyond The TruffleDome" (2017)
  - Episode 2.13 "Ultra-Max" (2019)
- Ghosted
  - Episode 1.12 "Hello Boys" (2018)
- This Is Us
  - 1.17: "What Now?" (2017)
- Orange is the New Black
  - 5.11: "Breaking the Fiberboard Ceiling" (2017)
- Divorce
  - 2.3 "Worth It" (2018)
- Mozart in the Jungle
  - 4.9 "I Want You to Think of Me" (2018)
- Reverie
  - 1.10 "Point of Origin" (2018)
- Atypical
  - 2.5 "The Egg is Pimping" (2018)
- Camping
  - 1.4 "Up All Night" (2018)
  - 1.6 "Carleen?!" (2018)
- Marvel's Runaways
  - 2.8 "Past Life" (2018)
- The Fix
  - 1.5 "Lie to Me" (2019)
- Dolly Parton's Heartstrings
  - 1.2 "Two Doors Down" (2019)
- Dispatches From Elsewhere
  - 1.2 "Simone" (2020)
- The Mysterious Benedict Society
  - 1.4 "A Whisper, Not a Shout" (2021)
- Made for Love
  - 2.7 "Under Open Sky" (2022)
  - 2.8 "Hazel vs. Hazel" (2022)
- For All Mankind
  - 3.3 "All In" (2022)
  - 3.4 "Happy Valley" (2022)
- Five Days at Memorial
  - 1.6 "45 Dead" (2022)
  - 1.7 "Nobody Knows the Trouble I've Seen" (2022)
  - 1.8 "The Reckoning" (2022)
- So Help Me Todd
  - 1.13 "Wall of Fire" (2023)
- Carnival Row
  - 2.3 "The Martyr's Hand" (2023)
  - 2.4 "An Unkindness of Ravens" (2023)
- Party Down
  - 3.6 "Sepulveda High School Spring Play Opening Night" (2023)
- Hysteria!
  - 1.2 "Die Young" (2024)
  - 1.7 "It's Late" (2024)
- Pulse
  - 1.7 "Choices" (2025)
  - 1.8 "Retreat" (2025)
- The Rookie
  - 8.2 "Fast Andy" (2026)

== Television/film editing credits ==
- Gray Matters (2007)
- Ed (2000) TV Series
- Now and Again (1999) TV Series
- Sex and the City (1998) TV Series
  - Episode "Coulda, Woulda, Shoulda"
  - Episode "Defining Moments"
  - Episode "Just Say Yes"
  - Episode "My Motherboard, My Self"
  - Episode "Time and Punishment"
  - Episode "What's Sex Got to Do with It?"
- Nick and Jane (1997)
- I'm Not Rappaport (1996)
- Canadian Bacon (1995)
- The Pesky Suitor (1995)
- City Arts (1994) TV Series
- The Making of '...And God Spoke' (1993)
- The Last Party (1993)
- Roger & Me (1989)
