= Escape! =

Science fiction short story by American writer Isaac Asimov

- Short story by Isaac Asimov
- Country: United States
- Language: English
- Genre: Science fiction

Publication
- Published in: Astounding Science Fiction
- Publication type: Periodical
- Publisher: Street & Smith
- Media type: Print (magazine, hardback and paperback)
- Publication date: August 1945

Chronology
- Series: Robot series
Risk	Evidence

"Escape!" is a science fiction short story by American writer Isaac Asimov. It was first published as "Paradoxical Escape" (a publisher's change in the title) in the August 1945 issue of Astounding Science Fiction and reprinted as "Escape!" (Asimov's choice of title) in the collections I, Robot (1950) and The Complete Robot (1982).

== Plot summary ==
Many research organizations are working to develop the hyperspatial drive. The company U.S. Robots and Mechanical Men, Inc., is approached by its biggest competitor that has plans for a working hyperspace engine that allows humans to survive the jump (a theme which would be further developed in future Asimov stories). But the staff of U.S. Robots is wary, because, in performing the calculations, their rival's (non-positronic) supercomputer has destroyed itself.

U.S. Robots finds a way to feed the information to its own positronic computer known as The Brain (which is not a robot in the strictest sense of the word, since it does not move, although it does obey the Three Laws of Robotics), without the same thing happening.

The Brain then directs the building of a hyperspace ship. Powell and Donovan board the spaceship, which takes off without them being initially aware of it. They find that The Brain has become a practical joker: the ship lacks manual controls, amenities such as showers and beds, and food aside from canned beans and milk.

Shortly after their journey begins, and after many strange visions by the crew, the ship safely returns to Base after two hyperspace jumps. By then, Dr. Susan Calvin has discovered what happened: any hyperspace jump causes the crew of the ship to cease existing for a brief moment, effectively dying, which is a violation of the First Law of Robotics (albeit a temporary one); the only reason the artificial intelligence of The Brain survived is because Susan reduced the importance of the potential deaths, and descending into irrational, childish behavior (as a means of coping) allows it to find a means for ensuring the survival of the crew.

Preceded by: "Risk"	Included in: I, Robot; The Complete Robot	Series: Robot series	Followed by: "Evidence"
