= List of Out of the Unknown episodes =

The anthology science fiction television series Out of the Unknown aired on BBC2 over four series between 4 October 1965 and 30 June 1971. The first two series were made and broadcast in black and white, and the latter two in colour. Many Out of the Unknown episodes were adaptations of short stories and novels. In such cases, the list below credits the story to the original author and lists the adapter in the following column. Instances where an adaptation was broadcast under a title different from that of the original work are footnoted as appropriate. Where a script was an original commission, the screenwriter is credited as the author and the “Adapted by” column is marked “n/a”.

Only twenty episodes of the series survive in the archives today, with an additional episode only existing partially (missing approximately 20 minutes). The “Exists?” column indicates whether an episode has survived or not. In some cases, short clips and/or audio recordings of missing episodes have survived – these are indicated in the footnotes.

== Series 1 ==
Series 1 was broadcast on Monday nights at 8:00pm. It was produced by Irene Shubik. Two episodes are missing, while ten survive, making it the most complete season of the show.

Episode	Title	Story	Adapted by	Director	Airdate	Exists?
101	“No Place Like Earth”	John Wyndham	Stanley Miller	Peter Potter	4 October 1965	Yes
102	“The Counterfeit Man”	Alan Nourse	Philip Broadley	George Spenton-Foster	11 October 1965	Yes
103	“Stranger in the Family”	David Campton	n/a	Alan Bridges	18 October 1965	Yes
104	“The Dead Past”	Isaac Asimov	Jeremy Paul	John Gorrie	25 October 1965	Yes
105	“Time in Advance”	William Tenn	Paul Erickson	Peter Sasdy	1 November 1965	Yes
106	“Come Buttercup, Come Daisy, Come...?”	Mike Watts	n/a	Paddy Russell	8 November 1965	Yes
107	“Sucker Bait”	Isaac Asimov	Meade Roberts	Naomi Capon	15 November 1965	Yes
108	“The Fox and the Forest”	Ray Bradbury	Terry Nation	Robin Midgley	22 November 1965	No
109	“Andover and the Android”	Kate Wilhelm	Bruce Stewart	Alan Cooke	29 November 1965	No
110	“Some Lapse of Time”	John Brunner	Leon Griffiths	Roger Jenkins	6 December 1965	Yes
111	“Thirteen to Centaurus”	J. G. Ballard	Stanley Miller	Peter Potter	13 December 1965	Yes
112	“The Midas Plague”	Frederik Pohl	Troy Kennedy Martin	Peter Sasdy	20 December 1965	Yes

== Series 2 ==
Series 2 was broadcast on Thursday nights at 9:30pm, except "The Prophet", which was broadcast on Saturday only two days after "Satisfaction Guaranteed". It was produced by Irene Shubik and the script editor was Michael Imison. Nine of the thirteen episodes are missing.

Episode	Title	Story	Adapted by	Director	Airdate	Exists?
201	“The Machine Stops”	E. M. Forster	Kenneth Cavender & Clive Donner	Phillip Saville	6 October 1966	Yes
202	“Frankenstein Mark 2”	Hugh Whitemore	n/a	Peter Duguid	13 October 1966	No
203	“Lambda 1”	Colin Kapp	Bruce Stewart	George Spenton-Foster	20 October 1966	Yes
204	“Level Seven”	Mordecai Roshwald	J. B. Priestley	Rudolph Cartier	27 October 1966	Yes
205	“Second Childhood”	Hugh Leonard	n/a	John Gorrie	10 November 1966	No
206	“The World in Silence”	John Rankine	Robert Gould	Naomi Capon	17 November 1966	No
207	“The Eye”	Henry Kuttner	Stanley Miller	Peter Sasdy	24 November 1966	No
208	“Tunnel Under the World”	Frederik Pohl	David Campton	Alan Cooke	1 December 1966	Yes
209	“The Fastest Draw”	Larry Eisenberg	Julian Bond	Herbert Wise	8 December 1966	No
210	“Too Many Cooks”	Larry Eisenberg	Hugh Whitemore	John Gibson	15 December 1966	No
211	“Walk's End”	William Trevor	n/a	Ian Curteis	22 December 1966	No
212	“Satisfaction Guaranteed”	Isaac Asimov	Hugh Leonard	John Gorrie	29 December 1966	No
213	“The Prophet”	Isaac Asimov	Robert Muller	Naomi Capon	1 January 1967	No

== Series 3 ==
Series 3 was broadcast on Wednesday nights at 9:00pm. It was produced by Alan Bromly and the script editor was Roger Parkes. All the scripts used in this series were commissioned by Irene Shubik. This was the first series to be made in colour. Only two episodes are known to exist (one partially), making it the most incomplete season of the show. This season also has the most surviving off-air soundtracks, with three in total used to reconstruct their respective episodes.

Episode	Title	Story	Adapted by	Director	Airdate	Exists?
301	“Immortality, Inc.”	Robert Sheckley	Jack Pulman	Terence Dudley	7 January 1969	No
302	“Liar!”	Isaac Asimov	David Campton	Gerald Blake	14 January 1969	No
303	“The Last Lonely Man”	John Brunner	Jeremy Paul	Douglas Camfield	21 January 1969	Yes
304	“Beach Head”	Clifford D. Simak	Robert Muller	James Cellan Jones	28 January 1969	No (reconstruction exists)
305	“Something in the Cellar”	Donald Bull	n/a	Roger Jenkins	4 February 1969	No
306	“Random Quest”	John Wyndham	Owen Holder	Christopher Barry	11 February 1969	No
307	“The Naked Sun”	Isaac Asimov	Robert Muller	Rudolph Cartier	18 February 1969	No (reconstruction exists)
308	“The Little Black Bag”	C. M. Kornbluth	Julian Bond	Eric Hills	25 February 1969	Partially
309	“1+1=1.5”	Brian Hayles	n/a	Michael Ferguson	4 March 1969	No
310	“The Fosters”	Michael Ashe	n/a	Philip Dudley	11 March 1969	No
311	“Target Generation”	Clifford D. Simak	Clive Exton	Roger Jenkins	18 March 1969	No
312	“The Yellow Pill”	Rog Phillips	Leon Griffiths	Michael Ferguson	25 March 1969	No (reconstruction exists)
313	“Get Off My Cloud”	Peter Phillips	David Climie	Peter Cregeen	1 April 1969	No

== Series 4 ==
Series 4 was broadcast on Wednesday nights at 9:20pm. It was produced by Alan Bromly and the script editor was Roger Parkes. Unlike previous series, only one episode was an adaptation. Six of the eleven episodes are missing, leaving five episodes surviving. A reconstruction using surviving audio exists for one episode.

Episode	Title	Story	Adapted by	Director	Airdate	Exists?
401	“Taste of Evil”	John Wiles	n/a	Michael Ferguson	21 April 1971	No
402	“To Lay a Ghost”	Michael J. Bird	n/a	Ken Hannam	28 April 1971	Yes
403	“This Body Is Mine”	John Tully	n/a	Eric Hills	5 May 1971	Yes
404	“Deathday”	Angus Hall	Brian Hayles	Raymond Menmuir	12 May 1971	Yes
405	“The Sons and Daughters of Tomorrow”	Edward Boyd	n/a	Gerald Blake	19 May 1971	No
406	“Welcome Home”	Moris Farhi	n/a	Eric Hills	26 May 1971	Yes
407	“The Last Witness”	Martin Worth	n/a	Michael Ferguson	2 June 1971	No
408	“The Man in My Head”	John Wiles	n/a	Peter Cregeen	9 June 1971	Yes
409	“The Chopper”	Nigel Kneale	n/a	Peter Cregeen	16 June 1971	No
410	“The Uninvited”	Michael J. Bird	n/a	Eric Hills	23 June 1971	No (reconstruction exists)
411	“The Shattered Eye”	David T. Chantler	n/a	Peter Hammond	30 June 1971	No
