= Light Verse (short story) =

- Short story by Isaac Asimov
- Country: United States
- Language: English
- Genre: Science fiction

Publication
- Published in: The Saturday Evening Post
- Publisher: Curtis Publishing Company
- Media type: Magazine
- Publication date: September–October 1973

Chronology
- Series: Robot series
Feminine Intuition	. . . That Thou Art Mindful of Him

"Light Verse" is a science fiction short story by American writer Isaac Asimov. It was first published in the September–October 1973 issue of The Saturday Evening Post. It later appeared in the collections Buy Jupiter and Other Stories (1975), The Complete Robot (1982), and Robot Dreams (1986). The author has reported that he wrote the initial draft in one session and later had to change hardly a word in the final revision.

This story details a small portion of the life of Avis Lardner, the widow of an astronaut, William J. Lardner.

== Plot summary ==
After her husband's death, Mrs. Lardner receives a large pension, which she invests wisely, becoming very wealthy. She buys many valuable jeweled artifacts from a number of countries, and displays them in her home. She then takes up the art of light-sculpture, which fascinates many, but she refuses to sell her works and only paints them for her parties.

Mrs. Lardner had become notable not only for the light sculptures, but for her quirky crew of robots, none of which had ever been readjusted. These robots maintained her household and guarded her valuables. She insisted that the maladjustments in her robots made them lovable and that it would be unspeakable cruelty to allow them to be "manhandled" at the factory to remove their maladjustments.

A roboticist with the U.S. Robots and Mechanical Men Corporation, John Travis, who has had a history of trying (and failing) to imitate her light sculptures, obtains an invitation to a party at Mrs. Lardner's home. At the party, seeing it as an act of kindness to Mrs. Lardner, he makes an adjustment to one of her robots, known as Max, whom he considers to be maladjusted. Discovering what he's done, Mrs. Lardner is furious at him, and reveals that Max is the one who actually does the light-sculptures, through a creative process made possible by his maladjustment. By adjusting Max, Travis has irreparably destroyed that creative process.

Mrs. Lardner then picks up one of her artifacts, a jeweled knife, and kills Travis. However, after the fact, investigators note that Travis did not attempt to defend himself — after realizing he had destroyed the very thing from which he wished to learn, he had fallen into total despair and allowed Mrs. Lardner to stab him to death.

== Similarities to other Asimov works ==
- The idea of a robot having creativity would be repeated in The Bicentennial Man.
- Light-sculpture was performed by Gladia Delmarre in The Naked Sun.
- The idea of an irreplaceable creation made by a malfunctioning robot and irreversibly destroyed due to a thoughtless human was explored in "Robot AL-76 Goes Astray".

Preceded by: "Feminine Intuition"	Included in: The Complete Robot; Robot Dreams	Series: Robot series Foundation Series	Followed by: "—That Thou art Mindful of Him"
