= The Positronic Man =

1992 novel by Isaac Asimov and Robert Silverberg

- Cover of the first edition (UK)
- Authors: Isaac Asimov; Robert Silverberg
- Cover artist: Peter Mennim
- Language: English
- Series: Robot series
- Genre: Science fiction
- Publisher: Gollancz (UK); Doubleday (US)
- Publication date: October 1992 (UK); 1993 (US)
- Publication place: United States
- Media type: Print
- Pages: 223
- ISBN: 0-575-04700-3
- Dewey Decimal: 813/.54 20
- LC Class: PS3551.S5 B5 1993
- Preceded by: Robot Visions
- Followed by: "Mother Earth"

The Positronic Man is a 1992 novel by American writers Isaac Asimov and Robert Silverberg, based on Asimov's 1976 novelette "The Bicentennial Man".

It is about a robot that begins to display characteristics, such as creativity, traditionally the province of humans; the robot is ultimately declared an official human being.

The 1999 film Bicentennial Man, starring Robin Williams, was based both on the original story and the novel.

== Plot summary ==
In the 21st century, the creation of the positronic brain leads to the development of robot laborers and revolutionizes life on Earth. Yet to the Martin family, their household robot NDR-113 is more than a mechanical servant. "Andrew" has become a trusted friend, a confidant, and a member of the Martin family.

The story is told from the perspective of Andrew (later known as Andrew Martin), an NDR-series robot owned by the Martin family, a departure from the usual practice by U.S. Robots and Mechanical Men of leasing robots.

Andrew's initial experiences with the Martin family are replete with awkward moments which demonstrate his lack of socialization. However, he is much better with inanimate objects and animals and begins to display sentient characteristics (such as creativity; emotion; self-awareness) traditionally the province of humans. He is taken off his mundane household duties, for which he was intended, and allowed to pursue his creativity, making a fortune by selling his creations.

Andrew seeks legal protection stemming from his initial creative output and eventual full recognition as a human, by gradually replacing his robotic components with synthetic organs, and citing the process as a transformation from robot to human. Succeeding generations of the Martin family assist him in his quest for humanity, but each is limited to what degree they are prepared to acknowledge Andrew's humanity.

In The Positronic Man, the trends of fictional robotics in Asimov's Robot series (as outlined in the book I, Robot) are detailed as background events, with an indication that they are influenced by Andrew's story. No more robots in Andrew's line are developed. There is also a movement towards centralized processing, including centralized control of robots, which would avoid any more self-reflecting robots such as Andrew.

Only when Andrew allows his positronic brain to "decay", thereby willfully abandoning his immortality, is he declared a human being. This event takes place on the two-hundredth anniversary of his creation, hence the title of the novella and film.

== Foundation universe ==
This story is set within Asimov's Foundation universe, which also includes his earlier Susan Calvin positronic robot tales. It is clearly set centuries prior to the events of his novelette "Mother Earth" and the novel The Caves of Steel, during a period in which the Spacer worlds have yet to turn against the people of the Earth, and in which the U.S. Robots corporation is still active.

== Adaptations ==
- Bicentennial Man (1999), film directed by Chris Columbus, based on novelette "The Bicentennial Man" and on novel The Positronic Man
