= The Evitable Conflict =

1950 science fiction short story by Isaac Asimov

- Short story by Isaac Asimov
- Country: United States
- Language: English
- Genre: Science fiction

Publication
- Published in: Astounding Science Fiction
- Publication type: Periodical
- Publisher: Street & Smith
- Media type: Print (magazine, hardback, paperback)
- Publication date: June 1950

Chronology
- Series: Robot series
Evidence	Robot Dreams

"The Evitable Conflict" is a science fiction short story by American writer Isaac Asimov. It first appeared in the June 1950 issue of Astounding Science Fiction and subsequently appeared in the collections I, Robot (1950), The Complete Robot (1982), and Robot Visions (1990). It features the character Stephen Byerley from the earlier "Evidence".

== Plot summary ==
Following on from the previous story 'Evidence,' in the year 2052, Stephen Byerley has been elected World Co-ordinator for a second term. Earth is divided into four geographical regions, each with a powerful supercomputer known as a Machine managing its economy. Byerley becomes concerned upon learning that the Machines have recently made errors leading to economic inefficiency. Consulting with the four regional Vice Co-ordinators, he finds that several prominent individuals and companies associated with the anti-Machine "Society for Humanity" have been damaged by the Machines' apparent mistakes.

Byerley believes that the Society is attempting to undermine the Machines by disobeying their instructions, with the goal of retaking power as humans, and proposes to have the movement suppressed. Susan Calvin tells him that this will not work, contending that the errors are in fact deliberate acts by the Machines. The Machines recognize their own necessity to humanity's continued peace and prosperity, and have thus inflicted a small amount of harm on selected individuals in order to protect themselves and continue guiding humanity's future. They keep their intent a secret to avoid anger and resistance by humans. Calvin concludes that the Machines have generalized the First Law to mean "No machine may harm humanity; or, through inaction, allow humanity to come to harm." (This is similar to the Zeroth Law which Asimov developed in later novels.) In effect, the Machines have decided that the only way to follow the First Law is to take control of humanity.

At the story's conclusion, Byerley and Calvin discuss whether the Machines' actions are ultimately for the best. While Byerley is initially horrified by the prospect of humanity losing any say in its future, Calvin suggests that humanity has never truly been in full command of its future, as humans' choices have always been dictated by their need to survive—leaving their destiny at the mercy of environmental and economic factors affecting their access to the Earth's limited resources. But since the Machines can manage the Earth's resources more efficiently than humans ever could, humans finally have all that they could ever need to survive, and interhuman conflicts are no longer necessary—finally putting world peace within humanity's grasp.

== Reception ==
Stanisław Lem praised the story's central theme as futurologically and empirically valuable.

== Adaptations ==
The story was broadcast as the final episode of a five-part 15 Minute Drama "radio adaptation" of Asimov's I, Robot on BBC Radio 4 in February 2017.

The 2004 film adaptation of I, Robot also includes major elements of the Evitable Conflict with the computer system V.I.K.I. taking the part of the Machine.

== See also ==
- Colossus: The Forbin Project

Preceded by: "Evidence"	Included in: I, Robot; The Complete Robot	Series: Robot series Foundation Series	Followed by: "Robot Dreams"
