= Gray Matters (2006 film) =

2006 American comedy film

- Theatrical release poster
- Directed by: Sue Kramer
- Screenplay by: Sue Kramer
- Produced by: Bob Yari; John J. Hermansen; Jill Footlick; Sue Kramer
- Starring: Heather Graham; Bridget Moynahan; Tom Cavanagh; Molly Shannon; Rachel Shelley; Alan Cumming; Sissy Spacek
- Cinematography: John Bartley
- Edited by: Wendey Stanzler
- Music by: Andrew Hollander
- Production companies: Bella Films; Archer Entertainment
- Distributed by: El Camino Pictures; Yari Film Group; Freestyle Releasing
- Release dates: October 21, 2006 (Hamptons International Film Festival); February 23, 2007 (United States)
- Running time: 96 minutes
- Country: United States
- Language: English
- Box office: $944,479

Gray Matters is a 2006 American romantic comedy film directed and written by Sue Kramer, starring Heather Graham, Tom Cavanagh, and Bridget Moynahan. The film premiered at the Hamptons International Film Festival on October 21, 2006. It opened in limited release in the United States on February 23, 2007.

== Plot ==
Gray, a family-oriented and quiet bachelorette, lives a close-knit life with her brother, Sam. Their lifestyle is generally co-dependent, involving them living together, going to dance classes together, etc. Gray and Sam's relationship has never been thought of as strange, but once a dinner party guest mistakes the siblings as a couple, Gray and Sam decide to venture outside of one another. While discussing what they can do about their single lifestyles and how they can "hook each other up" with a significant other, their conversation continues to the park, where Gray spots a possible girlfriend for Sam. Gray introduces herself to Charlie, then to Sam, and the two instantly like each other, agreeing to see each other again.

To Gray's surprise, Sam and Charlie become engaged the morning after their meeting. Charlie and Sam are so madly in love with one another that they plan to go to Las Vegas the following morning and elope there. They invite Gray along. Gray is a little hesitant, but agrees when Charlie says they can have a "mini bachelorette party". Gray agrees and the three make their way to Vegas. While in Vegas, Gray takes Charlie out for a hen night, and after many drinks, the two share a drunken but passionate kiss. The next morning, Charlie does not remember anything, but Gray has not slept the whole night, because of how she felt with Charlie. The situation makes Gray finally realize that not only is she attracted to women, but she is also falling in love with her sister-in-law.

The events in Vegas force a journey of self-discovery, testing the relationship between two very close siblings, and finding happiness in lonely Manhattan. When Gray eventually comes out to Sam as a lesbian, he tells her that he has known all along, since they were young kids.

Later, Sam accidentally discloses Gray's sexual orientation to her entire office, which, along with Sam's encouragement, gives her impetus to find her true self, pursue relationships with women, and find her own someone to love.

== Cast ==
- Heather Graham as Gray Baldwin
- Bridget Moynahan as Charlotte ("Charlie") Kelsey
- Tom Cavanagh as Sam Baldwin
- Molly Shannon as Carrie
- Rachel Shelley as Julia Barlett
- Bill Mondy as Jordan Phillips
- Don Ackerman as Conrad Spring
- Warren Christie as Trevor Brown
- Alan Cumming as Gordy
- Sissy Spacek as Dr. Sydney
- Gloria Gaynor as herself

== Production ==
Gray Matters was shot on location in New York City in twenty-one days. The screenplay was partially inspired by the life of the director's sister, Carolyn.

== Release ==
Gray Matters premiered at the Hamptons International Film Festival, in the Spotlight section, on October 21, 2006. It opened theatrically in limited release in New York and Los Angeles on February 23, 2007.

=== Home media ===
The DVD was released in Region 1 by Fox Home Entertainment on June 19, 2007. It was released in Region 2 by Momentum Pictures on August 13, 2007, and in Australia in 2007.

== Reception ==
On the review aggregator website Rotten Tomatoes, 8% of 65 critics' reviews are positive, with an average rating of 3.8/10. The website's consensus reads: "Gray Matters tries emulating Hollywood screwball classics, but the rapid fire dialogue and witticisms comes off only as a contrived gimmick." Metacritic, which uses a weighted average, assigned the film a score of 31 out of 100, based on 19 critics, indicating "generally unfavorable" reviews.
