= Feminine Intuition =

- Short story by Isaac Asimov
- Country: United States
- Language: English
- Genre: Science fiction

Publication
- Published in: The Magazine of Fantasy and Science Fiction
- Publication type: Periodical
- Publisher: Mercury Publications
- Media type: Print (Magazine, Hardback & Paperback)
- Publication date: October 1969

Chronology
- Series: Robot series
Robot Dreams	Light Verse

"Feminine Intuition" is a science fiction short story by American writer Isaac Asimov, originally published in the October 1969 issue of The Magazine of Fantasy and Science Fiction and collected in The Bicentennial Man and Other Stories (1976), The Complete Robot (1982), and Robot Visions (1990).

== Plot summary ==
Clinton Madarian, the successor to Susan Calvin at U.S. Robots who has just retired, initiates a project to create a "feminine" robot which not only has female physical characteristics but will (it is hoped) have a brain with "feminine intuition." After several failures together costing half a billion dollars, JN-5 (also known as Jane) is produced and the company plan to use it (her) to analyse astronomical data at the Lowell Observatory at Flagstaff, Arizona, to calculate the most likely stars in the vicinity of Earth to have habitable planets. This will allow the most effective use of the hyperspace drive to explore those stars.

Madarian and Jane go to Flagstaff and after absorbing as much knowledge on astronomy as possible, Jane gives Madarian an answer. Madarian and Jane board the plane that will take them back to U.S. Robots, and Madarian calls the director of the company with the news, stating that "a witness" had also heard Jane's answer. Unfortunately, Madarian and Jane are killed and destroyed respectively in an aircrash before completing the call.

Desperate to know what, if anything, Jane had discovered, U.S. Robots asks Susan Calvin for her assistance. She solves the problem using her own version of feminine intuition – a combination of careful information gathering and astute psychological reasoning. She deduces from the timing of the call (and Madarian's propensity to call as soon as possible) that the "witness" must have been the truck driver that took them to the plane. Information provided by this truck driver enables her to reconstruct Jane's answer.

Preceded by: "Robot Dreams"	Included in: The Complete Robot; Robot Visions	Series: Robot series Foundation Series	Followed by: "Light Verse"
