= Mother Earth (novella) =

- Short story by Isaac Asimov
- Country: United States
- Language: English
- Genre: Science fiction

Publication
- Published in: Astounding Science Fiction
- Publisher: Street & Smith
- Media type: Magazine
- Publication date: May 1949

Chronology
The Positronic Man	The Caves of Steel

"Mother Earth" is a science fiction novella by American writer Isaac Asimov. It was written from September 1 to October 10, 1948, and published in the May 1949 issue of Astounding Science Fiction. It was republished in Asimov's 1972 short story collection The Early Asimov.

== Context within Asimov's universe ==
No individual robots appear, nonetheless Asimov said:

What interests me most about "Mother Earth" is that it seems to show clear premonitions of the novels Caves of Steel and The Naked Sun, which I was to write in the 1950s."

The term "Galactic Empire" appears at the end of the novel. The first of Asimov's Empire novels, Pebble in the Sky, was written in 1947, the year before "Mother Earth".

Mother Earth will finally have given birth not to merely a Terrestrian, but to a Galactic Empire.

== Themes ==
A major theme of the story is the way in which the Spacers have closed their thinly populated worlds to Earth's crowded inhabitants.

== Plot summary ==
Earth faces a confrontation with its colonies, the "Outer Worlds." A historian looks back and sees the problem beginning a century and a half earlier, when Aurora got permission to "introduce positronic robots into their community life." No date is given, but fifty years before the story starts, the Outer Worlds established an immigration quota against incoming Terran citizens. The balance of power then tipped. Now war appears likely, and there are rumors that Earth has developed an unknown weapon, code-named the "Pacific Project."

On Aurora, there is also concern, but the Aurorans decide that the threat cannot be serious. They use authoritarian methods to suppress Ion Mereanu and his Conservatives, who wish to help Earth. They then call a gathering on Hesperus, one of the Outer Worlds, to unite them against Earth.

There is some rivalry from two other planets, Rhea and Tethys. But Earth unexpectedly sends a threatening message to all of the worlds, uniting them against Earth. War follows, and Earth swiftly loses. Trade is ended—the Outer Worlds have no need of Earth's exports, which are mostly agricultural. Earthmen are not allowed to journey beyond the Solar System.

The war was planned in the expectation of defeat—that was what the "Pacific Project" was all about. This is in part to force Earth to make necessary reforms including the use of robots, hydroponic agriculture, and population control. But the Outer Worlds will also weaken and split, because their worlds are biologically ill-suited to long-term human habitation. Several consequences for Earth are predicted from the entire conflict.

Preceded by: "The Bicentennial Man"	Included in: The Early Asimov	Series:	Followed by: The Caves of Steel
