= Risk (short story) =

1955 short story by Isaac Asimov

- Short story by Isaac Asimov
- Country: United States
- Language: English
- Genre: Science fiction

Publication
- Published in: Astounding Science Fiction
- Publisher: Street & Smith
- Media type: Magazine
- Publication date: May 1955

Chronology
- Series: Robot series
Little Lost Robot	Escape!

"Risk" is a science fiction short story by American writer Isaac Asimov, first published in the May 1955 issue of Astounding Science Fiction. It was reprinted in the collections The Rest of the Robots (1964) and The Complete Robot (1982).

The story is a sequel to "Little Lost Robot". It is set in the same location, but involves a different positronic robot - one of the few in Asimov's stories to have neither a serial number nor nickname.

== Plot summary ==
The researchers at Hyper Base are ready to test the first hyperspace ship. Previous experiments were successful in transportation of inert objects, but all attempts to transport living creatures have led to complete loss of higher brain function. As such, the ship has a positronic robot at the controls, since a robot is more expendable than a human, and its brain can later be precisely analyzed for errors to determine the cause. The ship fails to function as planned, and Susan Calvin persuades Gerald Black, an etherics engineer (who had also appeared in "Little Lost Robot"), to board the ship in order to locate the fault.

As Calvin suspects, Black finds that the fault lies with the robot, which, as a result of imprecise orders, has damaged the controls of the ship. They realize that the precise and finite robot mind must be compensated for by human ingenuity.

Preceded by: "Little Lost Robot"	Included in: The Rest of the Robots; The Complete Robot	Series: Robot series Foundation Series	Followed by: "Escape!"
