= Small Time (2014 film) =

2014 American comedy film

- Theatrical release poster
- Directed by: Joel Surnow
- Written by: Joel Surnow
- Produced by: K.C. Warnke
- Starring: Christopher Meloni; Devon Bostick; Dean Norris; Bridget Moynahan; Xander Berkeley; Ashley Jensen
- Cinematography: Feliks Parnell
- Edited by: David B. Thompson
- Music by: Sean Callery
- Production company: Asylum Entertainment
- Distributed by: Anchor Bay Entertainment
- Release date: April 18, 2014
- Running time: 95 minutes
- Country: United States
- Language: English

Small Time is a 2014 American comedy film written and directed by Joel Surnow. It stars Christopher Meloni, Devon Bostick, Dean Norris, Bridget Moynahan, Xander Berkeley and Ashley Jensen. It was released on April 18, 2014 by Anchor Bay Entertainment.

== Cast ==
- Christopher Meloni as Al Klein
- Dean Norris as Ash Martini
- Devon Bostick as Freddy
- Bridget Moynahan as Barbara
- Xander Berkeley as Chick
- Ashley Jensen as Gail
- Garcelle Beauvais as Linda Klein
- Amaury Nolasco as Barlow
- Ken Davitian as Wexler
- Gregory Itzin as Lennie
- Kevin Nealon as Irving "Irv"
