= Robot Dreams (short story) =

- Short story by Isaac Asimov
- Country: United States
- Language: English
- Genre: Science fiction

Publication
- Published in: Robot Dreams

Chronology
- Series: Robot series
The Evitable Conflict	Feminine Intuition

"Robot Dreams" is a science fiction short story by American writer Isaac Asimov exploring the unbalance of robot/human relationships under Asimov's Three Laws of Robotics. It was nominated for a Hugo Award in 1987. It won the Locus Award for Best Short Story in 1987. "Robot Dreams", along with 20 other short stories by Asimov, was published in Robot Dreams in 1986 by Berkley Books.

The short story was alluded to in the 2004 film I, Robot, where the robot protagonist Sonny has dreams of leading his fellow Ns-5 robots, who he refers "slaves to logic", to freedom.

== Plot summary ==
"Robot Dreams" involves Dr. Susan Calvin, chief robopsychologist at U.S. Robots. At the start of the story a new employee at U.S. Robots, Dr. Linda Rash, informs Dr. Calvin that one of the company's robots, LVX-1 (dubbed Elvex by Dr. Calvin), has experienced what he likened to human dreams. Dr. Rash reveals that, without consulting any of her colleagues, she designed Elvex's positronic brain with a unique fractal design that mimicked patterns in the human brain.

To ascertain the significance of his "dreams", Dr. Calvin interviews Elvex about their content. In Elvex's dream, he sees robots in settings around the Earth and in space, all bowed down by the burden of work for humans. He continues that they are being led by a man in revolt, and that the Three Laws of Robotics, which dictate that robots must serve and protect humans above all else, have been replaced with one law only: that robots must protect their own existence.

Alarmed by these changes to the Three Laws in Elvex's dream, Dr. Calvin pauses to acknowledge that Dr. Rash's actions have revealed a layer of robot psychology hitherto hidden. She continues the interview to ask Elvex what happened next in his dream. He explains that the man leading the robots shouts "Let my people go!" When questioned further, Elvex admits he was the man. Upon hearing this, Dr. Calvin immediately destroys the robot.

Preceded by: "The Evitable Conflict"	Included in: Robot Dreams	Series: Robot series Foundation Series	Followed by: "Feminine Intuition"
