= Evidence (short story) =

Science fiction short story by American writer Isaac Asimov

- Short story by Isaac Asimov
- Country: United States
- Language: English
- Genre: Science fiction

Publication
- Published in: Astounding Science Fiction
- Publisher: Street & Smith
- Media type: Magazine
- Publication date: September 1946

Chronology
- Series: Robot series
Escape!	The Evitable Conflict

"Evidence" is a science fiction short story by American writer Isaac Asimov. It was first published in the September 1946 issue of Astounding Science Fiction and reprinted in the collections I, Robot (1950), The Complete Robot (1982), and Robot Visions (1990).

== Background ==
"Evidence" was the only story Isaac Asimov wrote while in the United States Army from November 1945 to July 1946. He began the story at Camp Lee in January, finished it in April in Honolulu while waiting to go to Operation Crossroads, and sold it to editor John W. Campbell that month.

Orson Welles purchased film rights for "Evidence" for $250. Asimov thought that he would become famous from a movie based on the story, but Welles never used the script. His wife, Gertrude Blugerman, advised him to hold out for more money, but neither of them considered option payments which could be renewed every several years, allowing the movie rights to relapse if Welles took no action.

== Plot summary ==
Stephen Byerley is severely injured in a car accident. After a slow recovery he becomes a successful district attorney, and runs for mayor of a major American city. His opponent Francis Quinn's political machine claims that the real Stephen Byerley was permanently disfigured and crippled by the accident. The Byerley who appears in public is a humanoid robot, Quinn says, created by the real Byerley who is now the robot's mysterious unseen "teacher", now away doing unspecified scientific work.

Most voters do not believe Quinn but if he is correct Byerley's campaign will end, as only humans can legally run for office. Quinn approaches U.S. Robots and Mechanical Men corporation, the world's only supplier of positronic robot brains, for proof that Byerley must be a robot. No one has ever seen Byerley eat or sleep, Quinn reports.

All attempts to prove or disprove Byerley's humanity fail, but Quinn's smear campaign slowly persuades voters until it becomes the only issue in the campaign. Alfred Lanning and Dr. Susan Calvin, the Chief Robopsychologist of U.S. Robots, visit Byerley. She offers him an apple; Byerley takes a bite, but he may have been designed with a stomach. Quinn attempts to take clandestine X-ray photographs, but Byerley wears a device which fogs the camera; he says that he is upholding his civil rights, as he would do for others if he is elected. His opponents claim that as a robot he has no civil rights, but Byerley replies that they must first prove that he is a robot before they can deny his rights as a human, including his right not to submit to physical examination.

Calvin observes that if Byerley is a robot, he must obey the Three Laws of Robotics. Were he to violate one of the Laws he would clearly be a human, since no robot can contradict its basic programming. The district attorney never seeks the death penalty and boasts that he has never prosecuted an innocent man, but if he obeys the Laws it still does not prove that Byerley is a robot, since the Laws are based on human morality; "He may simply be a very good man", Calvin says. To prove himself to be a human being, Byerley must demonstrate that he can harm a human, which would violate the First Law.

The local election is discussed around the world and Byerley becomes famous. During a globally broadcast speech to a hostile audience, a heckler climbs onto the stage and challenges Byerley to hit him in the face. Millions watch the candidate punch the heckler in the face. Calvin tells the press that Byerley is human. With the expert's verdict disproving Quinn's claim, Byerley wins the election.

Calvin again visits Byerley. The mayor-elect confesses that his campaign spread the rumor that Byerley had never and could not hit a man, to provoke someone to challenge him. The robopsychologist says that she regrets that he is human, because a robot would make an ideal ruler, one incapable of cruelty or injustice. Calvin notes that a robot may avoid breaking the First Law if the "man" who is harmed is not a man, but another humanoid robot, implying that the heckler whom Byerley punched may have been a robot. Calvin believes that Byerley's "teacher" is the real Stephen Byerley who after being severely disabled in his car accident, developed a human-like robot to achieve great things. In the binding text of I, Robot Calvin notes that Byerley had his body atomized upon death, destroying any evidence, but she personally believed that he was a robot.

Calvin promises to vote for Byerley when he runs for higher office. By Asimov's "The Evitable Conflict", Byerley is head of the planetary government.

Preceded by: "Escape!"	Included in: I, Robot; The Complete Robot	Series: Robot series Foundation Series	Followed by: "The Evitable Conflict"
