= Liar! (short story) =

Science fiction short story by American writer Isaac Asimov

- Short story by Isaac Asimov
- Country: United States
- Language: English
- Genre: Science fiction

Publication
- Published in: Astounding Science Fiction
- Publication type: Periodical
- Publisher: Street & Smith
- Media type: Print (magazine, hardback and paperback)
- Publication date: May 1941

Chronology
- Series: Robot series
Catch that Rabbit	Satisfaction Guaranteed

"Liar!" is a science fiction short story by American writer Isaac Asimov. It first appeared in the May 1941 issue of Astounding Science Fiction and was reprinted in the collections I, Robot (1950) and The Complete Robot (1982). It was Asimov's third published positronic robot story. Although the word "robot" was introduced to the public by Czech writer Karel Čapek in his 1920 play R.U.R. (Rossum's Universal Robots), Asimov's story "Liar!" contains the first recorded use of the word "robotics" according to the Oxford English Dictionary. The events of this short story are also mentioned in the novel The Robots of Dawn written by the same author.

== Plot summary ==
Through a fault in manufacturing, a robot, RB-34 (also known as Herbie), is created that possesses telepathic abilities. While the roboticists at U.S. Robots and Mechanical Men investigate how this occurred, the robot tells them what other people are thinking. But the First Law still applies to this robot, and so it deliberately lies when necessary to avoid hurting their feelings and to make people happy, especially in terms of romance.

However, by lying, it is hurting them anyway. When it is confronted with this fact by Susan Calvin (to whom it falsely claimed her coworker was infatuated with her – a particularly painful lie), the robot experiences an insoluble logical conflict and becomes catatonic.

== Adaptations ==
- In 1958, "Liar!" was adapted into an episode of the radio show Exploring Tomorrow.
- El robot embustero (1966), short film directed by Antonio Lara de Gavilán
- In 1969, "Liar!" was adapted into an episode of the British television series Out of the Unknown, although only a few short clips of this episode are known to exist.
- The story was adapted in 1987 as part of episode 12 of the Soviet anthology series This Fantastic World ("Этот фантастический мир"). It featured Boris Plotnikov as RB-34 and Natalya Nazarova as Susan Calvin.
- The story was broadcast as episode four of a five-part 15 Minute Drama radio adaptation of Asimov's I, Robot on BBC Radio 4 in February 2017 and December 2025.

== Accolades ==
"Liar!" was voted 41st in the 2012 Locus Poll of Best 20th Century Short Stories.

== See also ==
- Liar paradox
- Does not compute
- HAL 9000, who confronted a similar paradox when told to keep a secret, while being "hardwired" to return information truthfully and without concealment.

Preceded by: "Catch that Rabbit"	Included in: I, Robot; The Complete Robot; Robot Visions	Series: Robot series Foundation Series	Followed by: "Satisfaction Guaranteed"
