= Six Degrees (TV series) =

Television series

- Genre: Drama
- Created by: M. Raven Metzner; Stuart Zicherman
- Starring: Jay Hernandez; Erika Christensen; Hope Davis; Dorian Missick; Bridget Moynahan; Campbell Scott
- Composers: Michael Giacchino Atli Örvarsson Adam Cohen
- Country of origin: United States
- Original language: English
- No. of seasons: 1
- No. of episodes: 13 (5 unaired in United States)

Production
- Executive producers: J. J. Abrams; Bryan Burk; M. Raven Metzner; Stuart Zicherman; Kenneth Biller; Carol Flint
- Producers: Peter Elkoff; Jane Raab
- Running time: 43 minutes
- Production companies: Bad Robot; Nosebleed Productions; Touchstone Television

Original release
- Network: ABC
- Release: September 21, 2006 – March 30, 2007

Six Degrees (or 6˚, stylized as ~~SIX DEGREES~~) is an American drama television series about six residents of New York City and their respective relationships and connections with one another, based on the idea of six degrees of separation.

It premiered on September 21, 2006, after Grey's Anatomy on ABC. The show was created by Raven Metzner and Stuart Zicherman. J. J. Abrams, Bryan Burk and Thom Sherman serve as executive producers through their Bad Robot banner. The pilot episode was directed by Rodrigo García. It was filmed on location in Manhattan and at Silvercup Studios in Long Island City, Queens, New York. The show's theme song, "Here Comes Now", was written and performed by Jakob Dylan.

The series was shown in Canada on Global on Wednesday evenings prior to the American airings. It made its United Kingdom debut on ITV on May 28, 2008, where all thirteen episodes were aired.

On November 8, 2006, Six Degrees was pulled off the schedule by ABC due to a decrease in ratings. By January 2007, ABC had not ordered any more episodes to be produced for the season.

The series returned on March 23, 2007, with its seventh episode in a new timeslot at 9:00pm EDT on Fridays and with Josh Charles added to the cast. After just two weeks back on the air, the series was pulled by ABC for a second time due to poor ratings, on April 2, 2007, further fueling doubts of the series continuing. On April 27, 2007, the unaired ninth episode was posted on ABC's website, with the last four weekly after.

On May 15, 2007, the series was canceled by ABC. In June 2007, ABC's programming calendar available to the media indicated the final episodes of the series would be broadcast beginning Friday, August 10, 2007; however, ABC decided instead to air repeats of another show.

== Cast and characters ==
- Jay Hernandez as Carlos Green, a struggling defense attorney who lets his feelings for Mae interfere with his job. He becomes friends with Damian after helping him out in a fight.
- Erika Christensen as Mae Anderson, a young woman attempting to start life over in New York City; gets a job as Laura's nanny. She has a mysterious box that contains "personal belongings", and refuses to let anyone see its contents. It is revealed in the episode "Masquerade" that at age 15, she was caught in an abusive relationship, which her brother Eric helped her out of by either assaulting or killing the man. Eric was wanted by the police for doing so.
- Hope Davis as Laura Morgan, a widow whose husband (played by Robert John Burke) was killed while working as an embedded journalist during the war in Iraq. She meets Whitney in a nail salon and the two become fast friends. However, Whitney's fiancé hits on Laura during Whitney's bridal shower. Laura is conflicted about revealing this to Whitney, who becomes angry and does not accept it until it becomes very clear that he has been cheating on her. Laura tries to move on with her life by getting a job as an assistant to an interior designer.
- Dorian Missick as Damian Henry, a gambling addict trying to lead a normal life by honestly earning his money as a limousine driver. He once was heavily involved in criminal activity, and his brother (one of his old partners-in-crime), continues to try to bring him back to a life of crime. His brother asks him to find a runaway that some friends are looking for, he is handed a picture of her not knowing the girl is Mae. He later finds out that this is Mae, and tells Carlos that bad people are looking for Mae, resulting in Carlos persuading Mae to let him help her.
- Bridget Moynahan as Whitney Crane, a Public Relations executive who is looking forward to marriage. She was unaware of the fact that her fiancé has been dating other women. She initially suspected him of it although he wrongly convinced her otherwise. However, later on, after her fiancé is punched by "The Puncher" and it is revealed that the men who Puncher hits are the men that have slept with the Puncher's wife, Whitney realizes that her fiancé has been cheating on her. She breaks it off and tries to deal with the fallout of the relationship by throwing herself into her career.
- Campbell Scott as Steven Caseman, a separated father who was believed by many to be dead when he ran off to Mexico. He took a picture of Laura crying (outdoors and without her knowledge) over the death of her husband, which helped bring him back to his old career in photography. Steven is struggling to persuade his wife to allow him to have more contact with their son Max; however, his wife does not trust Steven, since he once lost Max, and also disappeared for four months. His girlfriend, Anya (whom he met through Whitney) is roommates with Carlos.

== Episodes ==
No.	Title	Directed by	Written by	Original release date	US viewers (millions)
1	"Pilot"	Rodrigo Garcia	Raven Metzner & Stuart Zicherman	September 21, 2006	12.56
The show begins by establishing a little background information on each of the characters. We learn that Carlos is an up-and-coming lawyer, that Mae has some hidden past she is always running from, Laura lost her husband, who worked as a reporter, in Iraq, Damian is an almost limousine driver who has racked up some substantial gambling debts, Whitney's fiancé is cheating on her but still proposed to her, and that Steven is divorced and has a son and once was a respected photographer. As the show progresses, however, we begin to see how the characters interact. Whitney goes to a nail salon and meets Laura. Laura hires Mae as a nanny. Laura also watched the clip of her husband dying after an explosion and goes outside to mourn. Steven photographs her as he attempts to revive his career. Carlos requests help from Damian to get in a club so he can ask Mae on a date. After Carlos learns that Mae isn't at the club, he goes out to find Damian being beat up by two loan shark henchmen. He saves Damian and Damian wants to repay him by buying him a drink. While the two are at the bar, they see Whitney's fiancé making out with another woman. At the end of the episode, Carlos and Mae end up sitting across from each other in a subway car.
2	"What Are the Odds?"	Jace Alexander	Stuart Zicherman & Raven Metzner	September 28, 2006	10.15
Mae changes her mind about leaving New York; Carlos has his hands full with a case of attempted murder; Laura starts her new job; Whitney struggles with planning her wedding; Damian helps someone else's fate, but worries about his own; and Steven's new job could possibly turn his entire life around.
3	"A New Light"	Wendey Stanzler	Elisa Zuritsky, Peter Parnell, & Julie Rottenberg	October 5, 2006	9.11
Laura's perception of her deceased husband is changed by a video she received; Steven is urged to mix business with pleasure by a younger woman; While Mae seeks help in locating an old acquaintance from Carlos, who's in a difficult case.
4	"The Puncher"	Juan Campanella	Laura Wolner & Peter Elkoff	October 12, 2006	8.69
While the city is beset by the Puncher, a rogue criminal who punches total strangers and runs, Whitney plans her wedding. Meanwhile Laura wonders whether her friendship with Whitney can survive telling her the truth about Roy; Carlos and Mae go on a double date to a karaoke bar with Damian and Regina, and Damian realizes Mae's connection to him; and Steven meets with his son and ex-wife and learns that there are more complications to his new life than he originally thought.
5	"Masquerade"	Mary Harron	Pang-Ni Landrum	October 19, 2006	8.36
Damian reveals to Carlos what he knows about Mae and her past, but in the meantime, she prepares to run away from the place she's called home. Laura supports Whitney through her transition by attending her big work party -- a masquerade called the Monster Ball. Steven gets a chance to prove himself as a father to Max, but an unexpected situation leads to him failing.
6	"What You Wish For"	David Semel	Bradford Winters	November 2, 2006	7.40
Damian proposes to Regina but still won't be honest about his criminal past as they look to the future. Caseman finally gets a chance to spend quality time with his son, Max, but Whitney offers him the job of a lifetime, which forces him to reassess his priorities. Meanwhile, Laura receives a promotion with some big strings attached.
7	"Slings and Arrows"	Dean White	Julie Rottenberg & Elisa Zuritsky	March 23, 2007	4.45
Laura decides to leave the past behind when she has her first date since her husband died. But when she and Andrew visit a gallery opening, she discovers the photo that Steven took of her. Meanwhile, Whitney learns that Roy, her ex-fiancée, has acquired one of her clients. This new situation forces her to work with the man who broke her heart and dreams. Meanwhile, Carlos learns Damian's secret about the shooting.
8	"Get a Room"	Eric Laneuville	Peter Parnell	March 30, 2007	3.12
Whitney and Carlos are on the hunt for new apartments, and Carlos, Anya and Steven's lives change when a friend from the past returns. Meanwhile Whitney has a rebound affair with Todd (Jason Lewis), which she struggles to keep casual, Laura meets a new man through the connecting power of the Internet, and Mae and Carlos have trouble defining their relationship — and someone winds up getting hurt.
9	"Sedgewick's"	Tucker Gates	Peter Elkoff	April 27, 2007 (online)	N/A
Laura asks Whitney to work pro bono to save Sedgewick's, a local bar/restaurant that is scheduled to be redeveloped into a hotel. Whitney has to say no, since her father (the one who is redeveloping it) has already hired her to drum up favorable press coverage for him. Steven has a drink.
10	"Ray's Back"	Tony Goldwyn	Stuart Zicherman & Raven Metzner	May 4, 2007 (online)	N/A
Ray Jones, a self-described “connector” who has a past with some of the main characters, comes to town and gives Whitney, Steven, Laura, and Damian a $50,000 check, a fruit basket, a job, and a naked marriage proposal — not in that order, and not without arousing suspicion. Carlos interviews for a job at a private law firm.
11	"Surströmming or a Slice"	David Petrarca	Kenneth Biller & Peter Elkoff	May 11, 2007 (online)	N/A
Ray hires Laura and Steven to decorate his new office space; while working together they find that they're attracted to each other, which causes problem’s for Laura’s daughter Eliza. But Steven feels he can’t be in a relationship now. Mae finds the trail of Maggie Newton, an author and NYU professor who could be her mother. Ray gives Damian an impossible task at 5:32 a.m. and hires Laura, not J.T., to design his new office space. As a power play against Whitney, Ray hires Steven to take photos for the office. Damian uses Ray’s name to help Carlos.
12	"Objects in the Mirror"	Tom Verica	Peter Elkoff	May 18, 2007 (online)	N/A
Laura develops an interest in a carpenter who is working on her space. Carlos gets a professional boost from Ray, and is brought back into Mae’s life as a result. At the PR firm, Ray brings in a management consultant, who tells Whitney to fire staff and freeze promotions/raises after she had already promised one to her assistant, Melanie. Mae summons the courage to meet Maggie, but things don’t go as Mae had hoped. After learning of the specifics of the situation, Whitney ends a relationship with Maggie’s publishing house. Damian comes to a brotherly understanding with Michael, who is being sent to prison. Carlos and Lisa break up. Steven tells Laura he’d like to try again.
13	"A Simple Twist of Fate"	Eric Laneuville	Stuart Zicherman & Raven Metzner	May 25, 2007 (online)	N/A
Laura wants to keep her relationship with Steven secret; Steven wants to open up about it and is eventually forced to. Ray gives Whitney the opportunity to go on vacation; she debates whether to ask him to come. Steven’s car gets towed after taking shots of Ray with Whitney, causing him to spend a long time with Whitney. Melanie organizes the opening party for Ray's office, and her plans cause a bit of trouble, one of which being the electricity running out. Ray gives Damian silver cufflinks, only one of which makes it to the office party for the other one was used to restore the power. Reporters hound Mae and Laura about Maggie’s book, causing Mae to reveal to Laura her real name, and to decide to leave New York. On the late night, Whitney kisses Steven and he reveals that he and Laura are in a relationship. The next day Whitney confronts Laura, and she is shocked to see how jealous Whitney is of her and Steven. Whitney claims that she is just furious because she wished Laura would have told her. In an effort to avoid problems with the Justice Department, Ray wants Carlos to take advantage of Laura's trust in him to get her computer. Carlos does so and give the laptop to Ray, but not before he shows it to the Justice Department. On her way to the office party, Whitney tells Ray that she would not be going on vacation with him and she doesn't think that something will happen between them. At the office party, Laura sees Whitney and Steven talking, when Whitney goes to Laura and reveals that Steven adores Laura and that Laura should go after him before its too late. Laura assures Whitney that she will find someone, and they hug meaning their friendship is stronger than ever. Mae shows up and tells Laura and Carlos that she is done running and wants to live her life, when Carlos asks her to dance. The two dance as Lisa watches them when she reveals to the bartender that she is pregnant. Whitney walks home and runs into a man she met/saw earlier, they flirt for a minute and he leaves. Whitney then looks out and sees that her options are open.

== Reception ==
On review aggregator Rotten Tomatoes, the series holds a 42% approval rating based on 12 critic reviews. The website's critics consensus reads, "Despite a well-assembled cast, Six Degrees' central plot about interconnections at the Big Apple doesn't have enough moving parts to merge these boring individual stories into a truly interesting drama."
