= Bicentennial Man (film) =

1999 American science fiction film by Chris Columbus

- Theatrical release poster
- Directed by: Chris Columbus
- Screenplay by: Nicholas Kazan
- Based on: The Bicentennial Man by Isaac Asimov; The Positronic Man by Isaac Asimov Robert Silverberg
- Produced by: Wolfgang Petersen; Gail Katz; Laurence Mark; Neal Miller; Chris Columbus; Mark Radcliffe; Michael Barnathan
- Starring: Robin Williams; Sam Neill; Embeth Davidtz; Wendy Crewson; Oliver Platt
- Cinematography: Phil Méheux
- Edited by: Neil Travis
- Music by: James Horner
- Production companies: Columbia Pictures Touchstone Pictures 1492 Pictures; Laurence Mark Productions; Radiant Productions
- Distributed by: Buena Vista Pictures Distribution (North America) (Note: Distributed by Buena Vista Pictures Distribution in North America under the Touchstone Pictures banner.); Columbia TriStar Film Distributors International (International) (Note: Distributed by Columbia TriStar Film Distributors International in other territories under the Columbia Pictures banner.)
- Release date: December 17, 1999 (United States)
- Running time: 132 minutes
- Country: United States
- Language: English
- Budget: $90-100 million
- Box office: $87.4 million

Bicentennial Man is a 1999 American science fiction comedy drama film, directed by Chris Columbus, and starring Robin Williams, Sam Neill, Embeth Davidtz, Wendy Crewson and Oliver Platt. Based on the 1976 novelette of the same name by Isaac Asimov and the 1992 novel The Positronic Man by Asimov and Robert Silverberg, the title derives from the main character existing to the age of two hundred years.

Bicentennial Man was released in the United States on December 17, 1999, by Buena Vista Pictures Distribution under the Touchstone Pictures banner, with Columbia TriStar Film Distributors International releasing in other territories under the Columbia Pictures banner. It received mixed reviews from critics, and was a box office flop, grossing $87.4 million against a $90–100 million budget.

Makeup artist Greg Cannom was nominated for Best Makeup at the 72nd Academy Awards.

== Plot ==
On April 3, 2005, the NDR series robot "Andrew" is introduced into the Martin family home to perform housekeeping and maintenance duties and introduces himself by showing a presentation of the Three Laws of Robotics. The eldest daughter Grace despises Andrew, but her younger sister Amanda is sympathetic to him, and Andrew discovers he feels emotions, and is drawn to spend more time with his "Little Miss". He accidentally breaks one of her glass figurines and is able to carve a new one out of wood, which surprises her father Richard. Richard takes Andrew to NorthAm Robotics to inquire if Andrew's creativity was part of his programming. NorthAm's CEO Dennis Mansky claims this is a problem and offers to scrap Andrew, but instead Richard takes Andrew back home and encourages him to continue his creativity and explore other humanities. Andrew becomes a clockmaker and earns a sizable fortune managed by Richard after they find that robots have no rights under current laws.

In 2020, Richard encourages Dennis to retrofit Andrew with the ability to present facial expressions to match his emotions. In 2032, Andrew presents Richard with all the money he has made to ask for his freedom. Wounded by this, Richard refuses but grants Andrew his independence on the condition that he may no longer reside at the Martin home. Andrew builds his own home by the beach. In 2048, Richard is on his death bed, and apologizes to Andrew for banishing him all those years ago.

Following Richard's death, Andrew goes on a quest to find other NDR robots that are like him, frequently communicating back to Amanda, who has since married and divorced, and has a son Lloyd and granddaughter Portia. In 2068, Andrew discovers Galatea, an NDR robot that has been modified with a female personality and traits. Andrew becomes interested in how Galatea was modified by Rupert Burns, the son of the original NDR designer, and finds he has a number of potential ideas to help make robots appear more human-like. Andrew agrees to fund Rupert's work and to be a test subject and is soon given a human-like appearance. Andrew finally returns to the Martin home and finds that Amanda has grown old while Portia looks much like her grandmother at her age. Portia is initially cautious of Andrew, but soon accepts him as part of the Martin family.

When Amanda dies, Andrew realizes that all those he cares for will also pass on. He presents ideas to Rupert to create artificial organs that not only can be used in humans to prolong their lives but also to replace Andrew's mechanical workings. Andrew gains the ability to eat, feel emotions and sensations, and even have sexual relationships, resulting in him and Portia falling in love. Andrew petitions the World Congress to recognize him as a human as to allow him to marry Portia, but the body expresses concern that an immortal human will cause jealousy from others. Many years later when Portia is nearly 75 years old, Andrew returns to Rupert for one last operation: to change the artificial fluids driving his body into a blood equivalent. Rupert cautions him that the blood will not last forever, causing his body to age and will die eventually, a fate Andrew accepts. An unknown amount of years later, a now visibly aged Andrew again approaches the World Congress, with Portia as support, to appeal their past decision, wanting to be able to die with dignity.

On April 3, 2205, with Andrew's body deteriorating, he and Portia are both under life support monitored by Galatea, now with a human appearance. They hold hands and watch the World Congress as they recognize Andrew as a human being, the world's oldest at 200 years, and giving all rights confirmed by that, including validating his marriage to Portia. Andrew dies during the broadcast, which is confirmed by Galatea while Portia asserts that Andrew already knew the answer. After ordering Galatea to turn off her life support, Portia soon dies, hand-in-hand with Andrew as she whispers to him "See you soon".

== Cast ==
- Robin Williams as Andrew Martin, an NDR android servant of the Martin family that seeks to become human. Before Williams was cast, Tim Allen was considered for the role of Andrew Martin; Allen turned it down due to his commitment on Galaxy Quest.
- Sam Neill as Richard "Sir" Martin, the patriarch of the Martin family.
- Embeth Davidtz as Amanda "Little Miss" Martin (adult) and Portia Charney; Amanda is a friend of Andrew, the mother of Lloyd and grandmother of Portia while Portia is the daughter of Lloyd, the granddaughter of Amanda and significant other of Andrew.
- Hallie Kate Eisenberg as Amanda "Little Miss" Martin (age 7), the younger daughter of the Martin family.
- Wendy Crewson as Rachel "Ma'am" Martin, the matriarch of the Martin family.
- Oliver Platt as Rupert Burns, the son of the NDR creator that makes androids look more human-like.
- Stephen Root as Dennis Mansky
- Lynne Thigpen as Marjorie Bota, a later President/Speaker of the World Congress
- Bradley Whitford as Lloyd Charney (adult), Amanda's brat son.
- Igor Hiller as Lloyd Charney (age 10)
- Kiersten Warren as Galatea, the NDR android servant of Rupert and later a servant of the Martin family.
- John Michael Higgins as Bill Feingold, the Martin family attorney
- George D. Wallace as the President/Speaker of the World Congress
- Angela Landis as Grace "Miss" Martin (adult), the spoiled older brat daughter of the Martin family.
- Lindze Letherman as Grace "Miss" Martin (age 9)
- Jay Johnston as Charles

== Production ==
Walt Disney Studios was concerned about the cost of the film, estimated to be over $100 million, and even though pre-production was underway and sets were already being built they pulled the plug and halted production. The film was originally slated to be released under Disney's Hollywood Pictures label, until it was transferred to Touchstone Pictures during production. Disney Studio chairman Joe Roth came to an agreement with Sony Pictures Entertainment Chairman John Calley, to co-finance the film and agreed to split distribution responsibilities for the film between Touchstone Pictures in North America and Columbia Pictures internationally.

Robin Williams confirmed in a Las Vegas Sun interview that his character was not played by a body double and that he had actually worn the robot costume.

Various scenes were shot inside San Francisco City Hall, including the ball scene. The city charged Disney from $5,000 to $20,000 per day, depending on the particular location used for filming. The heat from two 10,000-watt spotlights triggered the fire sprinkler system and which resulted in flooding which caused water damage. Renovations had only recently been completed after a previous flooding incident. Filming was only interrupted for a few hours, but water damage to the ceilings, carpets, and limestone was significant.

== Reception ==
On Rotten Tomatoes, Bicentennial Man has an approval rating of 38% based on 98 reviews, with an average rating of 4.40/10. The website's critical consensus reads: "Bicentennial Man is ruined by a bad script and ends up being dull and mawkish." On Metacritic it has a weighted average score of 42 out of 100, based on reviews from 31 critics, indicating "mixed reviews". Audiences polled by CinemaScore gave the film an average grade of "A−" on an A+ to F scale.

Roger Ebert gave it two out of four stars: "Bicentennial Man begins with promise, proceeds in fits and starts, and finally sinks into a cornball drone of greeting-card sentiment. Robin Williams spends the first half of the film encased in a metallic robot suit, and when he emerges, the script turns robotic instead. What a letdown". William Arnold of the Seattle Post-Intelligencer said: "[The film] becomes a somber, sentimental and rather profound romantic fantasy that is more true to the spirit of the Golden Age of science-fiction writing than possibly any other movie of the '90s". Todd McCarthy of Variety summed it up as "an ambitious tale handled in a dawdling, sentimental way".

A sequel with the working title Tricentennial Man was originally planned; however, due to the mixed reception and poor box office sales of the original, it was cancelled before production could begin. The plot was expected to follow the political changes that took place after the death of Andrew the robot, and would feature a cameo appearance by Robin Williams appearing in his robotic form in the after life providing an answer to the philosophical question of whether robots could have a soul.

== Accolades ==
- Academy Awards — Best Makeup (lost to Topsy-Turvy)
- Blockbuster Entertainment Award — Favorite Actor — Comedy (Robin Williams) (lost to Adam Sandler in Big Daddy)
- Blockbuster Entertainment Award — Favorite Actress — Comedy (Embeth Davidtz) (lost to Drew Barrymore in Never Been Kissed)
- Hollywood Makeup Artist and Hair Stylist Guild Award — Best Character Makeup — Feature (lost to Sleepy Hollow)
- Nickelodeon Kids' Choice Awards — Favorite Movie Actor (Robin Williams) (lost to Adam Sandler in Big Daddy)
- Razzie Award — Worst Actor (Robin Williams) (lost to Adam Sandler in Big Daddy)
- Seiun Award — Best Dramatic Presentation (lost to Kōkidō Gensō Gunparade March)
- YoungStar Award — Best Young Actress/Performance in a Motion Picture Comedy (Hallie Kate Eisenberg) (lost to Natalie Portman in Where the Heart Is)
