= Catch That Rabbit =

1944 short story by Isaac Asimov

- Short story by Isaac Asimov
- Country: United States
- Language: English
- Genre: Science fiction

Publication
- Published in: Astounding Science Fiction
- Publication type: Periodical
- Publisher: Street & Smith
- Media type: Print (magazine, hardback and paperback)
- Publication date: February 1944

Chronology
- Series: Robot series
Reason	Liar!

"Catch that Rabbit" is a science fiction short story by American writer Isaac Asimov. It was first published in the February 1944 issue of Astounding Science Fiction and reprinted in the collections I, Robot (1950) and The Complete Robot (1982).

== Plot summary ==
The recurring team of Powell and Donovan are testing a new model of robot on an asteroid mining station. This DV-5 (Dave) has six subsidiary robots, described as "fingers", which it controls via positronic fields, a means of transmission not yet fully understood by roboticists. When the humans are not in contact, the robot stops producing ore. It cannot recall the time periods when it stops mining, and states that it finds this just as puzzling as the humans do.

Powell and Donovan secretly observe the robot without its knowledge. It starts performing strange marches and dances with its subsidiaries whenever something unexpected happens—an early example of a Heisenbug (software problem). To learn more, the humans try to create an emergency situation around the robot in order to observe the precise moment of malfunction, but accidentally trap themselves in a cave-in. They eventually figure that the main robot has too many subsidiaries. The "fingers" function independently until there is a serious need of decisiveness, when the main brain has to assume 6-way-control of all "fingers", which requires an excess of initiative and causes overload. When the humans were watching, their presence reduced the initiative placed on the robot's mind, and it would not break down. To get themselves rescued, the humans shoot and destroy one of the subsidiaries. The main robotic brain can cope with five-way control, hence the robots stop dancing and the First Law takes over.

Powell anthropomorphises the error as the robot twiddling its "fingers" whenever it becomes overwhelmed by its job. This is another example of Asimov's writing of robopsychology—personified by Susan Calvin—as running parallel to human psychology. At this point in I, Robot, the reader has already seen hysteria and religious mania.

Preceded by: "Reason"	Included in: I, Robot; The Complete Robot	Series: Robot series Foundation Series	Followed by: "Liar!"
