= My Living Doll =

American science fiction sitcom (1964–1965)

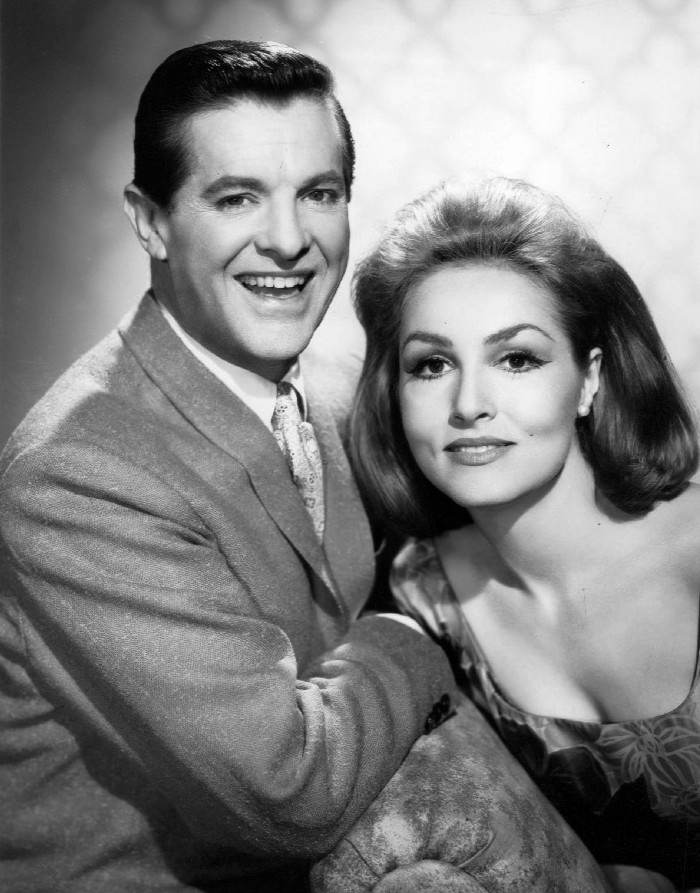
- Bob Cummings and Julie Newmar, 1964
- Genre: Science fiction sitcom
- Created by: Bill Kelsay; Al Martin; Leo Guild
- Starring: Bob Cummings; Julie Newmar; Jack Mullaney; Doris Dowling
- Theme music composer: George Greeley
- Composer: George Greeley
- Country of origin: United States
- Original language: English
- No. of seasons: 1
- No. of episodes: 26 (list of episodes)

Production
- Executive producer: Jack Chertok
- Producer: Howard Leeds
- Camera setup: Single-camera
- Running time: 24–25 min
- Production companies: Jack Chertok Television Productions; CBS Television Network

Original release
- Network: CBS
- Release: September 27, 1964 – March 17, 1965

My Living Doll is an American science-fiction sitcom starring Bob Cummings and Julie Newmar. The series was aired on CBS from September 27, 1964, to March 17, 1965. It was produced by Jack Chertok and filmed at Desilu studios by Jack Chertok Television Productions, in association with the CBS Television Network.

== Series background ==
U.S. Air Force psychiatrist Dr. Bob McDonald discovers his colleague, scientist Dr. Carl Miller, has built a prototype android as part of a top-secret research project when the lifelike android — a sexy, Amazonian female termed AF-709 — wanders from Miller's lab. Because McDonald is the only one with knowledge of the android, Miller entrusts him with the robot when he is suddenly transferred to Pakistan on assignment for a few months. Bob is initially reluctant, but soon sees the android as an opportunity to create what he defines as "the perfect woman:" one who "does what she's told" and "doesn't talk back."

Under the guise that the android is Miller's niece Rhoda, Bob attempts to educate Rhoda to be "the perfect woman" while she attempts to learn how human society works. Bob strives to keep her identity a secret, especially from his sister Irene — who moves in with the two as a chaperone — and his friend and colleague Peter Robinson, who fancies himself a "ladies' man" and chases after Rhoda. As the series develops, Rhoda begins showing (or at least emulating) rudimentary emotions as the series progresses. For example, in the episode "The Kleptomaniac", she displays a childlike, playful attitude. At one point McDonald notices this and utters, "What a goofy robot!", to which Rhoda replies, beaming, "The goofiest!" At the conclusion of this episode, Rhoda giggles without prompting after pulling a plot-resolving prank on another character. Another episode, "The Pool Shark", has Rhoda displaying apparent enjoyment in playing pool. The series does not explore whether these are truly learned behaviors or the result of programming, or if, within the fantasy context of the series, Rhoda is truly learning human emotion.

Near the end of the season, Bob is suddenly transferred to Pakistan to join Miller (a storyline necessitated by Cummings's abrupt departure), and entrusts Rhoda to Peter. Peter attempts to continue Bob's experiment with the assistance of his housekeeper Mrs. Moffat.

== Cast ==
- Bob Cummings as Dr. Bob McDonald
- Julie Newmar as Rhoda / AF-709
- Doris Dowling as Irene Adams, Bob's sister who moves in as a housekeeper and chaperone.
- Jack Mullaney as Peter Robinson, a lecherous colleague and neighbor of Bob's who decides that Rhoda is the girl of his dreams.

=== Recurring ===
- Henry Beckman as Dr. Carl Miller, Bob's colleague and the creator of Rhoda.
- Nora Marlowe as Mrs. Moffat, Peter's housekeeper.

== Production ==
The show was created by Jack Chertok based on the Pygmalion–Galatea myth. The series was unusual in that it was bought by the network without a formal pilot, at the request of CBS's president James T. Aubrey, due to the success of Chertok's series My Favorite Martian. The show was announced in April 1964. Filming began at Desilu Studios in July 1964. Outdoor scenes for the opening episode ("Boy Meets Girl") were filmed at Space Park under the pseudonym of "Space Research Center" (SRC). It was there in Redondo Beach, California that Rhoda was shown wandering off the campus, but was soon found by Dr. McDonald across the street at a drive-in named "Phil's Freeze" in Manhattan Beach.

The series was developed with Julie Newmar in mind for the female lead. CBS had been looking for a vehicle for Newmar for two years, and found this to be the best project for her. Producers originally wanted Efrem Zimbalist, Jr. for the male lead, originally meant to be a "straight" role opposite Newmar. However, CBS also had Bob Cummings under contract, and overruled them to place Cummings in the series.

The New York Times, reviewing the show in September, said it:

...very probably has the makings of a popular novelty hit... with Miss Newmar giving a light and amusing performance as the automated dish, the premise could work out... Bob Cummings, an old hand at chaperoning pretty girls, again is cast in his familiar assignment.

=== Cummings's departure ===
Despite good reviews, early ratings were poor. The show was initially scheduled opposite NBC's Bonanza on Sunday nights, but was shifted to Wednesdays in December in an attempt to improve ratings. This did not work, and in January, Cummings asked to be written out of the show after 21 episodes. CBS did not announce a replacement for him, indicating that they did not want to continue the series.

At the time, reportedly Cummings and Newmar were not getting along during production, with Newmar stating in a 1965 interview that Cummings had tried to teach her how to act, was unhappy that she appeared to be getting more press attention than he was, and was "trying too desperately to hold on to his long-gone youth". However, this is denied by Newmar and show producer Howard Leeds in The Living Doll Story, a featurette included in the 2012 DVD release.

Another report said that Cummings was unhappy with the size of his role in comparison to Newmar's.

In later years, Newmar said the trouble was Cummings's addiction to methamphetamine. She says this contributed to his erratic behavior on set, as well as his increasing depression and insecurity. He demanded that the show focus more on his character. CBS refused and Cummings left.

Cummings's last appearance was in "The Witness", the show's 21st episode, which aired on February 10, 1965. The following week's episode explained that his character had been transferred to Pakistan; the Peter character learns Rhoda's secret and takes over the position of watching over her. This was the plot device for the last five episodes of the season, and the series was not renewed for a second season.

=== Opening credits ===
Two versions of the opening credits were created. The first version had Rhoda wearing short lingerie similar to a teddy; according to an interview with Newmar included on the DVD release, this version was rejected as being too risque, so a new version with Rhoda wearing a long dress (though a little suggestive of lingerie) was filmed. This latter version is the one used on the versions of the episodes that were broadcast and released to DVD; however, the unofficial circulation of several episodes used the teddy version of the credits.

== Episodes ==
No.	Title	Directed by	Written by	Original release date	Prod. code
1	"Boy Meets Girl?"	Lawrence Dobkin	Bill Kelsay & Al Martin	September 27, 1964	6255-01
Space Agency psychiatrist Bob McDonald finds a top-secret prototype female robot named AF-709, after her creator Dr. Carl Miller searches for her frantically when she wanders from the lab. Bob assists Miller in trying to rescue her, but ends up entrusted with her when Miller is abruptly reassigned to Pakistan effective immediately.
2	"Rhoda's First Date"	Ezra Stone	Martin Ragaway	October 4, 1964	6255-02
After buying some clothes and reading material for Rhoda, Bob instructs his sister Irene not to disturb her while he is at work. When Irene ignores these instructions, neighbor Peter Robinson asks her out on a date which Irene encourages. Bob panics among finding out, and even more so when Rhoda faits at the restaurant when her OFF button accidentally gets pushed, and she is rushed to the hospital.
3	"Uninvited Guest"	Ezra Stone	Roland Wolpert	October 11, 1964	6255-03
Rhoda develops vertigo — as well as a difficulty distinguishing fantasy from reality — when Lewis Carroll's Alice in Wonderland interferes with her computing. Bob tries to reset her while his boss Dr. Cooper (Hubert Rudley) visits to question Bob about Miller's top-secret "project" with the idea that Miller has stolen numerous electronics used in the project (unaware that they went to create Rhoda).
4^{†}	"Lesson in Love"	Ezra Stone	Unknown	October 18, 1964	6255-04
Bob's sister Irene programs Rhoda to act as if she is in love, and Rhoda takes the information to her transistorized heart, causing much confusion.
5^{†}	"Rhoda's Debut" "Rhoda and the V.I.P."	Ezra Stone	Howard Merrill & Al Schwartz	October 25, 1964	6255-05
Bob is escorting a general's daughter to a V.I.P. reception and gives strict orders that Rhoda is not to leave the apartment, but, of course, that doesn't happen.
6	"Something Borrowed, Something Blew"	Ezra Stone	Bill Kelsay & Al Martin	November 1, 1964	6255-06
Bob is chairman of a psychiatric clinic's fund-raising drive, and he and Rhoda call on the donor with the greatest potential: millionaire playboy Walter J. Armbruster; the playboy takes a great liking to her and decides he wishes to marry her.
7	"The Love Machine"	Ezra Stone	Bernard Slade	November 8, 1964	6255-07
It would take a computer to find the right girl for Peter, and Bob has just the tool, Rhoda. He furnishes Rhoda with information on 250 girls working at the space lab, trying to find a match for Peter.
8	"The Beauty Contest"	Ezra Stone	Tom Koch	November 15, 1964	6255-10
Irene sneaks Rhoda into a beauty contest for which Bob is a judge.
9^{†}	"Leave 'Em Laughing" "Not So Comic, Comic"	Ezra Stone	Unknown	November 22, 1964	6255-08
Bob's friend, Herbert, would rather be a comic than a pharmacist, but he's not a very good comedian, so Bob has been asked to persuade the young man to stick to filling prescriptions.
10	"My Robot, The Warden"	Ezra Stone	Unknown	November 29, 1964	6255-09
Bob's working extremely hard on a magazine article, and he instructs Rhoda to make certain that he finishes on time.
11^{†}	"The Rhoda Gamble" "Just Lucky, I Guess"	Ezra Stone	Unknown	December 6, 1964	6255-11
Trying to cure a compulsive gambler, Bob gets Rhoda to use her mathematical skill to predict the fall of the dice.
12^{†}	"The Language Barrier"	Ezra Stone	Unknown	December 13, 1964	6255-12
Dr. McDonald's scheduled meeting with a colleague from the Far East is not going well. Rhoda goofed and instructed the interpreter not to show up.
13^{†}	"Little White Lie" "The Doctor Is In"	Ezra Stone	Unknown	December 16, 1964	6255-13
When Bob gets the opportunity to have lunch with an attractive lady therapist, he asks Rhoda to cancel his luncheon with the chief of police.
14	"I'll Leave It to You"	Ezra Stone	Unknown	December 23, 1964	6255-14
Meek millionaire Jonas Clay intends on leaving his fortune to a charity, and not his domineering sister & her son, but Clay needs Bob to certify that he's of sound mind and fit to control his own money.
15^{†}	"Mechanical Perfection"	Ezra Stone	Unknown	December 30, 1964	6255-15
After comparing herself to the flawless Rhoda, depressed and discouraged Irene feels very inadequate.
16	"Pool Shark"	Ezra Stone	Unknown	January 6, 1965	6255-16
Peter owes a small fortune to a pool shark, but he very cleverly signed Bob's name to the IOU. They send in Rhoda to play the pool shark, and, with her abilities, she beats the shark and repays the debt.
17^{†}	"Color Me Trouble"	Ezra Stone	Unknown	January 13, 1965	6255-18
Rhoda copies a Picasso so accurately that an art dealer believes it to be the real thing right down to the signature. Bob tries in vain to convince the dealer that the painting is a forgery.
18	"The Kleptomaniac"	Ezra Stone	Russell Beggs	January 20, 1965	6255-19
Rhoda, unaware that department stores are places where people purchase things, helps herself to gems from a jewellery counter, as a gift for Bob's sister.
19^{†}	"Sky Divers"	Ezra Stone	Unknown	January 27, 1965	6255-17
Peter follows Bob's advice about facing up to his fears by taking a giant step: Peter tells everyone that he's an accomplished sky diver. The only problem is that Peter has lied!
20^{†}	"The Robotic Astronaut"	Ezra Stone	Unknown	February 3, 1965	6255-20
Bob takes Rhoda along when he goes out of town to interview a group of women applying for the astronaut program, and Rhoda applies.
21	"The Witness"	Ezra Stone	Howard Dimsdale	February 10, 1965	6255-21
Bob gets off to an inauspicious start as chairman of a road-safety committee when his car is crashed into by his neighbor's car, and then Rhoda testifies in court about the entire incident. Note: This episode features the final appearances of Bob Cummings and Doris Dowling.
22^{†}	"Rhoda Meets Dr. Robinson" "Boy Gets Robot"	Ezra Stone	Unknown	February 17, 1965	6255-22
Bob has been called to Pakistan to assist Dr. Miller, and Rhoda's government supervisor, Dr. Foster, agrees to put her in the care of Bob's neighbor Peter, who is alarmed to find that the girl of his dreams is really a computer wonder.
23^{†}	"Dancing Doll"	Ezra Stone	Unknown	February 24, 1965	6255-23
Peter and Rhoda perform in a ballet, after their escorting ballerina Angela Carruthers to a TV interview goes very wrong.
24^{†}	"The Mannequin" "A Paris Original"	Ezra Stone	Unknown	March 3, 1965	6255-24
When a fashion photographer finds Rhoda's almost perfect ability to take commands in robotic perfection, this causes Peter no end of trouble as his date, who he was meeting at the fashion house, had the original assignment.
25^{†}	"Murder, He Says" "Rhoda's Suntan"	Ezra Stone	Unknown	March 10, 1965	6255-25
Rhoda's day at the beach over-charges her solar batteries. Peter must place her in the apartment's closet wrapped in a carpet to prevent any more exposure. As a result, the apartment's handy man thinks Peter is hiding a body and calls in the cops.
26^{†}	"Brother Harry" "Comic Interference"	Ezra Stone	Unknown	March 17, 1965	6255-26
Mrs. Moffit's brother, a failed nightclub comedian, causes problems when he moves into Peter's apartment. He tries to teach Rhoda the finer points of stand-up comedy and the right time to laugh.

^† Episode is lost.

== Home media ==
On March 20, 2012, MPI Home Video released My Living Doll—The Official Collection, Volume 1 on DVD in Region 1. The 2-disc set features 11 episodes of the series. The episodes featured on the DVD collection were created from 16mm prints of the show held by collectors, as the one known set of original 35mm negatives were destroyed in the 1994 Northridge earthquake.

== In popular culture ==
According to The Random House Historical Dictionary of American Slang, My Living Doll is the source of the science fiction phrase "Does not compute" in popular culture. The phrase was regularly used by Rhoda when confronted with contradictory information, usually in relation to human behavior. On a few occasions when she did understand the information, her response was "that does compute".

My Living Doll producer Howard Leeds went on to create Small Wonder, a 1980s sitcom featuring a young girl robot named Vicki. He also employed composer George Greeley, who wrote the music for My Living Doll.

Leeds, when in the employ of Reg Grundy Productions Australia producing Chopper Squad, proposed and produced a new My Living Doll presentation pilot, "Billion Dollar Baby", using an all-Australian cast.

In 2018, Jack Chertok Television Productions producer Peter Greenwood apparently had posts on his LinkedIn account stating that he had begun active development of a new My Living Doll limited series; his account also featured a bound set of the original series scripts as part of the post. The posts may also have stated that the reboot "would be more in tune with present-day morals and would change a great deal of the format to highlight the character, based on the current need for positive, intelligent and meaningful female role models."

It has been speculated that the Star Trek: Voyager character Seven of Nine's name is a homage to Rhoda's original designation as AF 709.
