= The Counterfeit Man =

1963 collection of short stories by Alan E. Nourse

- First edition
- Author: Alan E. Nourse
- Cover artist: Mel Hunter
- Language: English
- Genre: Science fiction
- Publisher: David McKay
- Publication date: 1963 (paperback)
- Publication place: United States
- Media type: Print

The Counterfeit Man is a collection of science fiction short stories by American writer Alan E. Nourse, published in 1963 by David McKay. Several of the stories have a medical or psychological theme.

== Contents ==
- "The Counterfeit Man": The medical officer of an exploratory spaceship returning from Ganymede determines that the crew has been infiltrated by at least one highly malicious shapeshifting alien. He forces one intruder, which can almost perfectly mimic human physiology down to the cellular level, to betray itself and ejects it into space with the cooperation of the expedition commander. The doctor then sabotages the ship to temporarily strand it in orbit around Earth, going ahead in a shuttle with proof in hand to order a quarantine. When the ship lands, the entire crew is accounted for and the incredulous doctor storms back into the ship to search it, only to be ambushed and killed by the remaining alien, which has taken on his own guise. It heads into the surrounding city. This story was adapted as the second episode of the BBC television series Out of the Unknown.
- "The Canvas Bag": A drifter with only a vague recollection of his own past stops in a town and falls in love, which prompts him toward introspection. Examining his rather fuzzy memories, he realizes—to his shock—that he is over 150 years old. Having cursed his mother and his home, he has been punished with eternal homelessness, saddled with immortality, forgetfulness, and an irresistible thousand-year compulsion to wander the Earth. The girl he loved chases him down at the bus stop at the last minute, choosing to wander with him.
- "An Ounce of Cure": A short, absurdist satirical piece on Nourse's own medical profession: a middle-aged man goes to his doctor seeking treatment of his foot pain, but instead becomes trapped in a maelstrom of arcane diagnostic procedures and endless referrals to increasingly ridiculous specialists. Eventually the patient gives up on conventional medicine and goes to a beturbaned Eastern mystic instead.
- "The Dark Door": A former psychological experimenter, trapped in deeply paranoid persecution fantasies, appeals to his former mentor for help. The mentor, operating on a sinister hidden agenda, instead imprisons him in a machine resembling an early conception of a VR rig, subjecting him to a series of psychotic delusions. The purpose of the abuse is apparently to try to use trauma to force the subject to rediscover a vital finding he had uncovered during his earlier experimental work, which may be what had driven him insane to begin with.
- "Meeting of the Board": Another satire, this one set in a future in which American industry has been badly compromised by workers purchasing full joint-stock ownership of their companies, mismanaging them into a state of stolid uncompetitiveness. For its humor, the story relies on the role-reversal of workers abusing and mistreating management, until the white-collar employees go on strike, withholding managerial services.
- "Circus": A very human-like alien is stranded on Earth, and futilely tries to convince Earthlings that he is an authentic extraterrestrial. Unfortunately the only human who will believe him is an SF writer, who over coffee in a diner gently informs the visitor that—due to his profession—no other human would find him credible on the subject.
- "My Friend Bobby": A disturbing story told in first person, by a young boy who can read minds. His father is mostly absent, and his power causes his mother to slowly come to fear and hate him, his only companion being his collie Bobby, with whom he has formed a telepathic link.
- "The Link": A cultured, gentle alien society has spent millennia fleeing from planet to planet, one step ahead of "the Hunters," their long-separated militaristic cousins, with whom they had fought a long-past war on their mutual homeworld. A young man and woman elect to stay behind on the aliens' current homeworld, which is being abandoned in the face of an advancing Hunter war fleet, to meet the pursuers face to face for the first time in ages. They hope to sue for peace, but find the Hunters implacable and cruel, lacking empathy or culture. Ordered to sing for the Hunters' commander, they are accused of trying to telepathically subvert their listeners, and are tortured for information until they erase their own minds in despair. However, their captors—oddly and subtly affected by their music—decide to dump them in the wilderness of the abandoned world, instead of killing them. The ending implies an "Adam and Eve" scenario.
- "Image of the Gods": The hardscrabble human agricultural colony on the hostile world of Baron IV is informed that Earth has undergone a regime change, apparently for the worse, and that they must accept a new military governor, whose first act is to unreasonably increase their agricultural-export quota. The colonists refuse the order and attempt to offer armed resistance, with the unexpected aid of Baron IV's primitive but helpful alien autochthones, the Dusties, who—they learn—have come to worship them as gods.
- "The Expert Touch": A reluctant experimental subject is tricked by his doctor into a painful battle against his inner demons, as part of a scheme to find the key to human sanity; the ordeal leaves him perfectly sane, but also—and perhaps as a consequence—highly unhelpful.
- "Second Sight": A young woman is the only true psychic on Earth. She is pressured by her government handlers to take part in an experiment to try to induce her powers in other similarly handicapped people—the ending reveals that she is deaf and blind, all of her senses being entirely psionic.
