= Canned beans =

Beans sold in cans for consumption

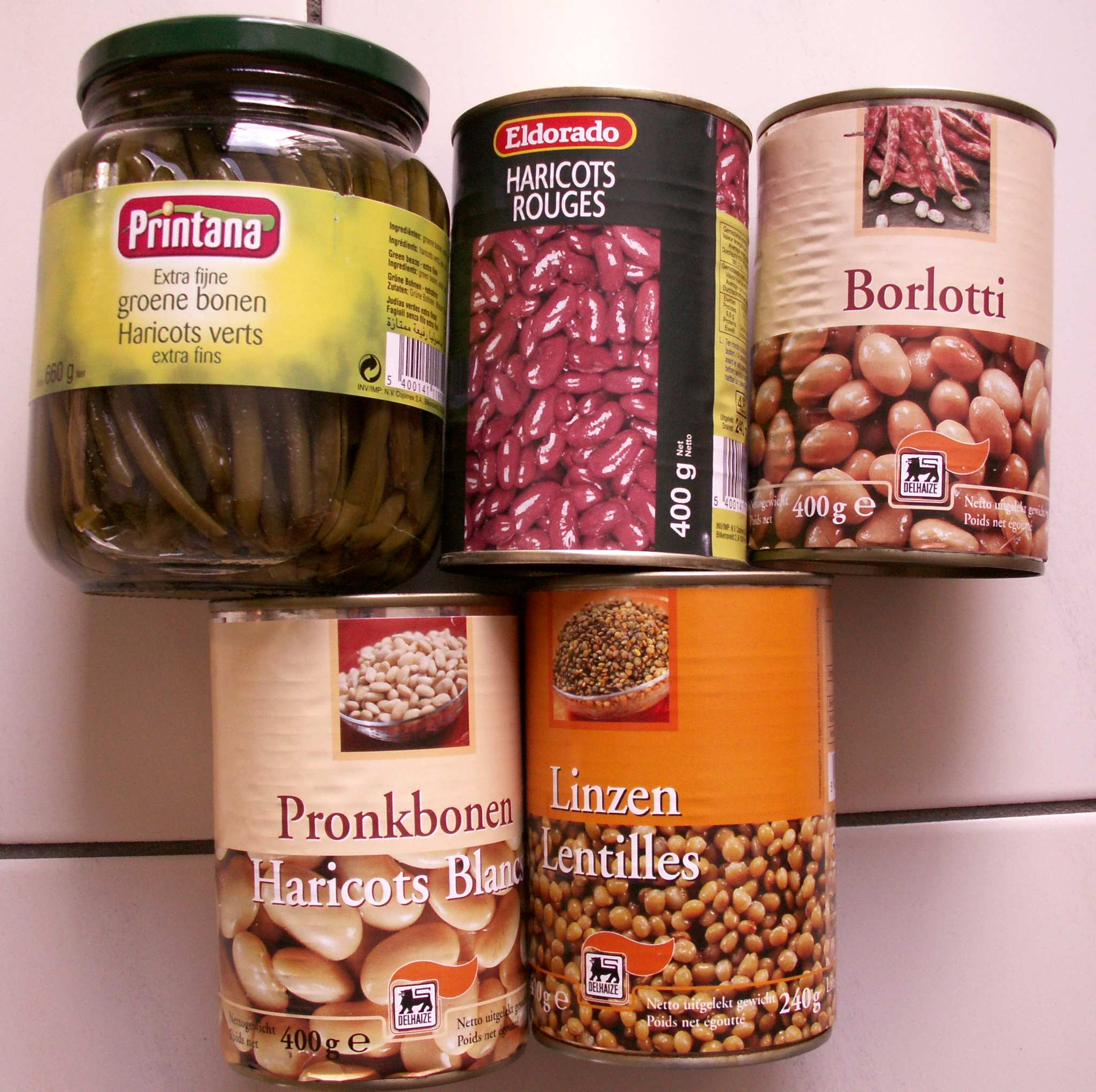
Several varieties of canned beans. From top left, clockwise: green beans, red kidney beans, borlotti beans, lentils and haricot beans

Canned beans refers to a number of bean products canned in salt, water, and preservatives.

== Description ==
A variety of beans and other legumes are available canned in salt, water, and preservatives. Canned beans are pre-cooked to make them easier to prepare for consumers. They may be substituted in recipes which call for cooked beans, however the canned variety may have a more soft and mushy texture than their dried and soaked counterparts. Canned beans may also refer to pork and beans, typically served in a tomato-based sauce flavored by pork, or canned baked beans.

No-salt added canned beans are also available. Canned beans are typically sold at grocery stores, organic food stores, and bulk food stores.

Canned beans on shelves in an American grocery store, featuring a variety of beans, flavors, and brands available for purchase.

== History ==
The technique of canning foods to preserve them for later consumption was first developed by Nicolas Appert whose 1810 book on the subject provided readers around the world with a detailed, step-by-step guide to the canning process. During his research for the text, Appert had used beans, as well as peas and various meats, in his tests for this new preservation method, making them some of the earliest examples of successfully canned foods.

Throughout the 19th Century, canning would be adopted by nations around the world as a vital method of preserving and distributing foods to their deployed armies and navies which retained more of the vital nutrients–such as Vitamin C–than previous methods such as drying. During this period, commercial and home canning also began to rise in popularity as a way to cheaply store and ship foods around the world. However, early canning also saw fears raised over reported cases of extreme illness or even death resulting from eating canned food which had been processed with inadequate sterilization and resulted in risks of botulinum toxin poisoning.

By the turn of the 20th Century, industrial canning had become highly efficient, with some models of automated machines reportedly capable of processing up to 35,000 cans of food per day, allowing meat and vegetable companies to massively expand their market reach. It was during this period in the early 1900's that prominent canned beans companies such as the H. J. Heinz Company and Bush Brothers and Company were established–though Bush Brothers would originally focus on the canning and distribution of tomatoes before introducing their first line of canned pork and beans in 1933.

== Home preservation ==
Home canned beans may be prepared in a variety of ways. Safety measures must be taken when canning beans at home, as improperly canned beans can cause illness to the consumer.

== Brands ==
- Bush Brothers and Company
- Heinz Baked Beans
- Luck's Beans
- Van Camp's

== See also ==
- Canned chili, which may contain beans
- Beanpot, a cooking vessel for beans
