= Bridget Moynahan =

American actress and former model (born 1971)

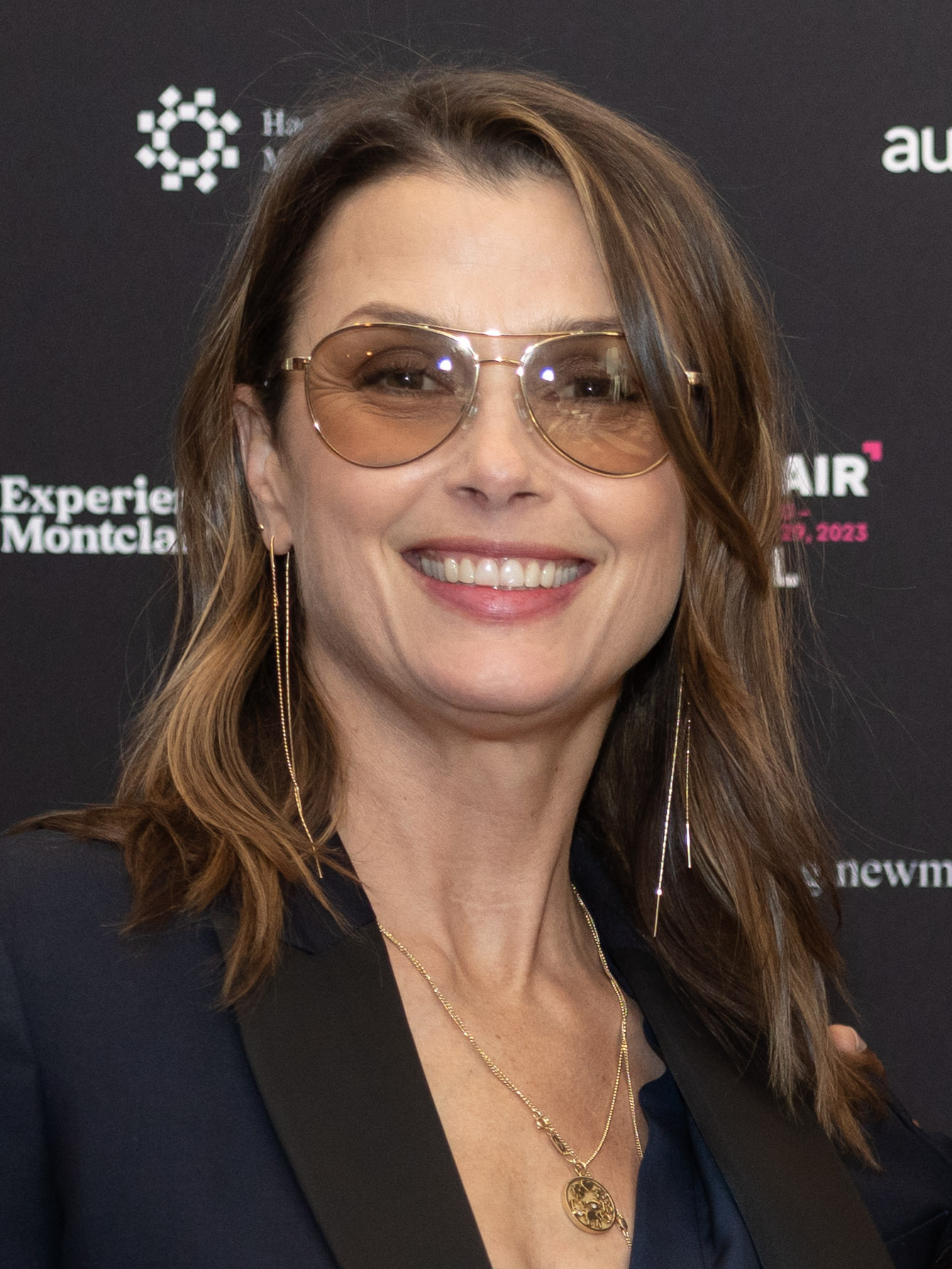
- Moynahan in 2023
- Born: Kathryn Bridget Moynahan; April 28, 1971 (age 55); Binghamton, New York, U.S.
- Occupations: Actress; model
- Years active: 1989–present
- Spouse: Andrew Frankel (m. 2015)
- Partner: Tom Brady (2004–2006)
- Children: 1

Kathryn Bridget Moynahan (born April 28, 1971) is an American actress and former model. She graduated from Longmeadow High School in Massachusetts in 1989 and began pursuing a career in modeling. Moynahan appeared in department-store catalogs and magazines, and after doing television commercials, began taking acting lessons. She made her television debut in a guest appearance in the comedy series Sex and the City in 1999, where she later had a recurring role as Natasha.

Moynahan made her feature-film debut in Coyote Ugly (2000). She had supporting roles in Serendipity (2001); The Sum of All Fears (2002); The Recruit (2003); I, Robot (2004); Lord of War (2005); Gray Matters (2006); Prey (2007); Noise (2007); Ramona and Beezus (2010); John Wick (2014); The Journey Home (2014) and John Wick: Chapter 2 (2017).

Moynahan starred in the ABC television series Six Degrees, which premiered in September 2006, and was taken off the schedule after just eight episodes. From 2010 to 2024, she starred as Erin Reagan in the CBS police drama Blue Bloods.

== Early life ==
Kathryn Bridget Moynahan was born April 28, 1971, in Binghamton, New York. She is the daughter of Irish Americans Mary Bridget (née Moriarty), a former school teacher, and Edward Bradley Moynahan, a scientist and former administrator at the University of Massachusetts Amherst, and has described her family background as Irish-Catholic. Moynahan has an older brother, Andy, and a younger brother, Sean, who work as a computer programmer and potter, respectively. When Moynahan was around seven years old, her family moved to Longmeadow, Massachusetts, where she later attended Longmeadow High School. Moynahan was captain of the girls' soccer, basketball, and lacrosse teams and graduated from high school in 1989. She has stated that she was a "tomboy" in her childhood.

== Career ==
=== Modeling ===
After graduating from high school, Moynahan pursued a modeling career despite having never read fashion magazines growing up. She accompanied a friend to a modeling audition in Springfield, Massachusetts; at the audition, Moynahan was signed by the modeling agency and her friend was not. Moynahan moved to New York City at age 18. A year later, she began appearing in magazines such as Vogue and Elle and on the covers of other widely known magazines. Her cover highlights include Vogue Paris (May 1993), Elle (October 1993), and Glamour (six times).

=== Film and TV ===
Discussing her modeling work in a July 2004 interview, Moynahan said, "It was a crazy world that paid a lot of money. I liked being a model, but I knew it would never last, so I looked into acting." She began doing soap and shampoo commercials in addition to taking acting and art classes. She studied acting with Iris Klein and made her TV debut in 1999 as Natasha in HBO's romantic comedy Sex and the City. She later had a recurring role in the show until the divorce of her character from Mr. Big (Chris Noth). The following year, she appeared in smaller film roles, including having parts in In the Weeds and Whipped.

Moynahan made her feature-film debut in the 2000 comedy-drama Coyote Ugly as Rachel, a bartender and dancer in a wild New York bar, a role considered her breakthrough. She accepted the role because she "thought it was interesting that the whole movie revolved around five women…and my character was so strong and independent". The film received generally unfavorable reviews, but was a box-office success, earning $133 million worldwide. Her next role was a supporting role in 2001 film Serendipity as Hally, the fiancée of John Cusack's character.

Moynahan worked opposite Ben Affleck and Morgan Freeman in the action film The Sum of All Fears, based on Tom Clancy's book of the same name. She played Dr. Catherine Muller, a love interest for Affleck's Jack Ryan. Dave Larsen of the Dayton Daily News reported the subplot involving Moynahan and Affleck was "the film's weakest point". The film received ambivalent reviews, but was a commercial success, earning $193 million at the box office. Moynahan's next role was as a CIA trainee in The Recruit (2003). The movie was poorly received, with Mike Clark of USA Today calling it "a less-than-middling melodrama whose subject matter and talent never click as much as its credits portend".

In 2004, Moynahan worked alongside Will Smith in Alex Proyas' science-fiction movie I, Robot, loosely based on Isaac Asimov's short-story collection of the same name. She portrayed Dr. Susan Calvin, a specialist in robot psychology. The film received mixed reviews, though critics enjoyed Moynahan's performance. Daniel Neman of Richmond Times-Dispatch disliked the film, concluding that Moynahan "turns in an able performance as Dr. Calvin, the convenient character". With revenue of $347 million worldwide, the film remains Moynahan's most commercially successful picture to date. Her next movie was 2005's Lord of War, a political crime thriller, where she played Ava Fontaine Orlov, the wife of Nicolas Cage's character. In 2006, Maxim named Moynahan #96 on its annual "Hot 100" list.

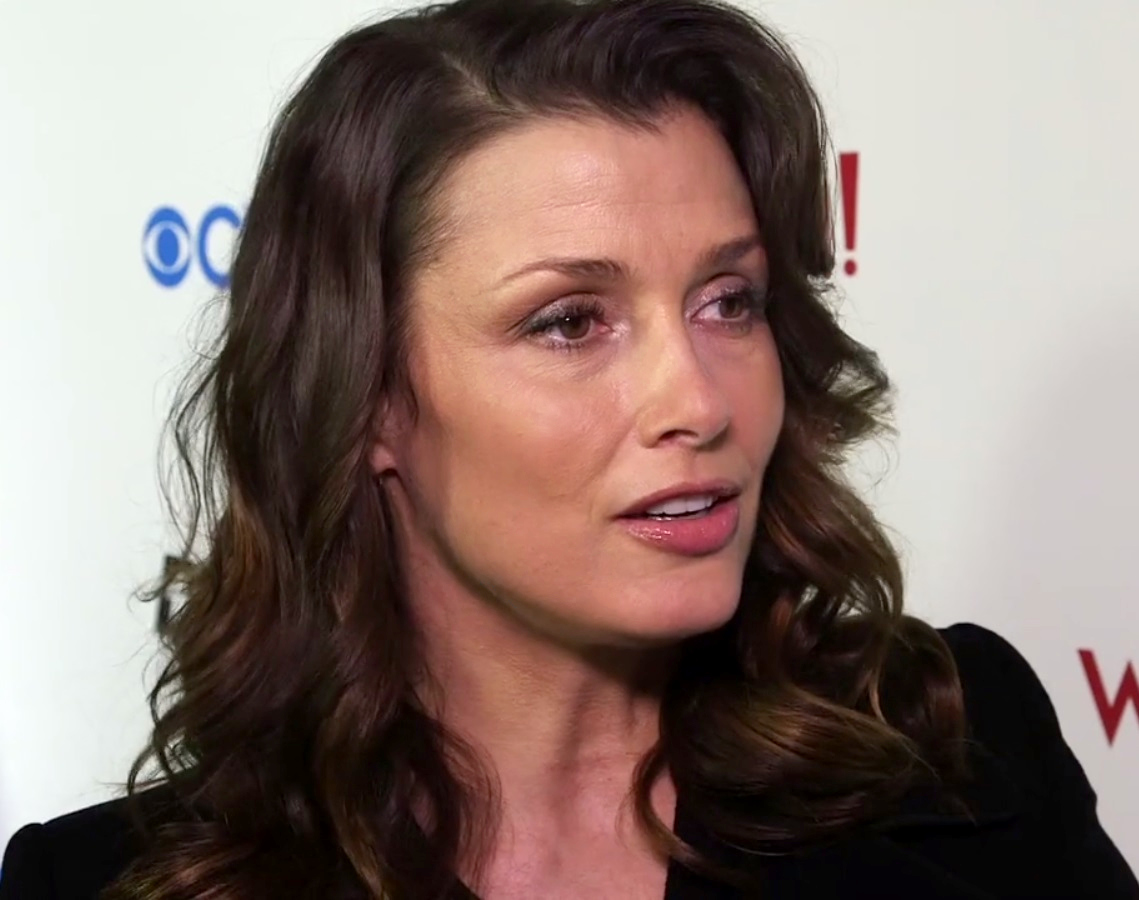
Moynahan at the Watch! Magazine 10 year anniversary event in 2016

In September 2006, away from film, Moynahan worked as Whitney Crane in the ABC television drama series Six Degrees co-starring with Jay Hernandez, Erika Christensen, Hope Davis, Dorian Missick, and Campbell Scott. The series centered on six residents of New York City and their relationships and connections with one another, based on the idea of six degrees of separation. It debuted on September 20, 2006, and was watched by almost 13.3 million viewers. It debuted to varied reception, with David Hinckley of the New York Daily News writing, "In theory, it's an intriguing concept for a series. But in practice, Six Degrees doesn't work at all in drawing you in at the start." After one season, it was cancelled in May 2007.

Moynahan's next film role was in the November 2006 thriller Unknown, about a group of individuals kidnapped and trying to escape their captors together. She was next seen in 2007, in Gray Matters, working with Heather Graham and Tom Cavanagh, before being cast in Henry Bean's comedy-drama Noise as Helen Owen, the wife of David Owen (Tim Robbins). The movie was screened at a special presentation at the 2007 Rome Film Festival and released in theaters in 2008.

In December 2008, Moynahan guest-starred in two episodes of the ABC television comedy-drama Eli Stone as the titular character's (Jonny Lee Miller) ex-girlfriend. Returning to film, she appeared in Ramona and Beezus, as the mother to Joey King and Selena Gomez's characters. The film was directed by Elizabeth Allen and released in July 2010. The next year, Moynahan worked with Aaron Eckhart, Michelle Rodriguez and Michael Peña in the action science-fiction feature Battle: Los Angeles (2011).

Beginning in 2010, Moynahan starred as Assistant District Attorney Erin Reagan on the CBS television show Blue Bloods. Co-star Donnie Wahlberg encouraged her to take the role after working with her on a 2008 TV pilot called Bunker Hill. Moynahan portrayed Erin Reagan throughout Blue Bloods' 14-year run. Moynahan has also directed episodes of the series.

In November 2009, Moynahan signed a deal with Garnier to appear in television and print advertising promoting their Ultra-Lift skincare products.

In 2014, Moynahan appeared as the late wife of the title character in the action film John Wick, and appearing in the 2017 sequel. Most recently, in 2019, she starred in the action film Crown Vic.

She co-produced and appeared in a short film called Swipe NYC released in 2023.

== Personal life ==
Moynahan lived with screenwriter Scott Rosenberg from 2001 to 2003.

She dated NFL quarterback Tom Brady from 2004 to 2006. On February 18, 2007, Moynahan's representative confirmed that she was more than three months pregnant and that Brady was the father. On August 22, 2007, she gave birth to their son, Jack. Connie Simpson served as nanny.

In 2010, she moved from Pacific Palisades, California, to New York City when she was cast in Blue Bloods. Moynahan was in a brief relationship with director McG in late 2010.

On October 17, 2015, she married businessman Andrew Frankel at a ceremony in the Hamptons. Moynahan is the stepmother to Frankel's three sons from a previous marriage.

In 2025, she was honored with the JFK National Award given to an honoree with Irish heritage from the St. Patrick's Committee in Holyoke, Massachusetts, organizer of the Holyoke Saint Patrick's Day Parade.

== Filmography ==
=== Film ===
Year	Title	Role	Notes
1999	Row Your Boat	Apartment owner	
2000	In the Weeds	Amy	
2000	Trifling with Fate	Fame	
2000	Coyote Ugly	Rachel	
2000	Whipped	Marie	
2001	Serendipity	Halley Buchanan	
2002	The Sum of All Fears	Dr. Cathy Muller	
2003	The Recruit	CIA agent Layla Moore	
2004	I, Robot	Dr. Susan Calvin	
2005	Lord of War	Ava Fontaine	
2006	Gray Matters	Charlie Kelsey	
2006	Unknown	Eliza Coles	
2007	Prey	Amy Newman	
2007	Noise	Helen Owen	
2010	Ramona and Beezus	Dorothy Quimby	
2011	Battle: Los Angeles	Michele	
2014	Small Time	Barbara	
2014	Midnight Sun	Luke's mom	
2014	John Wick	Helen Wick	
2017	John Wick: Chapter 2	Helen Wick	
2019	Crown Vic	Tracy Peters	
2023	John Wick: Chapter 4	Helen Wick	Cameo; Archive footage
2023	Swipe NYC	Cassie	Short film
2026	Original Sound	Linda Summers Weiss	

=== Television ===
Year	Title	Role	Notes
1999–2000	Sex and the City	Natasha Naginsky	Recurring role
2001	Going to California	Lily	"Lily of the Field"
2006–2007	Six Degrees	Whitney Crane	Main role
2008	Eli Stone	Ashley Cardiff	"Help!" & "Owner of a Lonely Heart"
2009	Bunker Hill	Erin Moriarty	TV movie
2010–2024	Blue Bloods	Erin Reagan	Main role
2021	And Just Like That...	Natasha Naginsky	"When in Rome"
2025–2026	Boston Blue	Erin Reagan	"Pilot" & "L'Dor Vador"
TBA	The Land	Belinda	Recurring role

== Books ==
- Moynahan, Bridget; Goldberg, Wendy; Peterson, Chris (2015). The Blue Bloods Cookbook: 120 Recipes That Will Bring Your Family to the Table. New York: St. Martin's Press. ISBN 9781250072856. OCLC 918562873.
