= Susan Calvin =

Fictional character from the Foundation-Universe by Isaac Asimov

- Susan Calvin, as portrayed by Bridget Moynahan, in the 2004 film I, Robot
- First appearance: "Liar!" (1941)
- Last appearance: I, Robot: To Preserve (2016)
- Created by: Isaac Asimov
- Portrayed by: Maxine Audley; Beatrix Lehmann; Ann Firbank; Margaret Robertson; Bridget Moynahan

In-universe information
- Gender: Female
- Occupation: Robopsychologist
- Nationality: American

Dr. Susan Calvin is a fictional character appearing in Isaac Asimov's Robot series of science fiction short stories. According to I, Robot, Susan Calvin was born in the year 1982 and died at the age of 82, either in 2064 or 2065.

She was the chief robopsychologist at US Robots and Mechanical Men, Inc., posited as the major manufacturer of robots in the 21st century. She was the main character in many of Asimov's short stories concerning robots, which were later collected in the books I, Robot and The Complete Robot.

== Fictional character biography ==
According to Asimov's fictional history of robotics, Susan Calvin was born in 1982, the same year that US Robots and Mechanical Men was incorporated. At 16, she wrote the first of many papers on robotics, a Physics-1 paper entitled "Practical Aspects of Robotics". This was after attending a Psycho-Math seminar at which Dr Alfred Lanning of US Robots demonstrated the first mobile robot to be equipped with a voice. As quoted in I, Robot; "Susan said nothing at that seminar; took no part in the hectic discussion period that followed. She was a frosty girl, plain and colorless, who protected herself against a world she disliked by a mask-like expression and a hypertrophy of intellect. But as she watched and listened, she felt the stirrings of a cold enthusiasm".

In "Evidence", when asked, "Are robots so different from men?", she replies, "Worlds different. Robots are essentially decent". Harlan Ellison's screenplay adaptation of I, Robot investigates its origins, and in the end concludes that her attitudes are rather well-founded.

An excerpt from Harlan Ellison's screenplay adaptation of I, Robot said of Calvin:

She is a small woman, but there is a towering strength in her face. Tensile strength, that speaks to endurance, to maintaining in the imperfect world. Her mouth is thin, and her face pale. Grace lives in her features, and intelligence; but she is not an attractive woman. She is not one of those women who in later years it can be said of them, "She must have been a beauty when she was younger". Susan Calvin was always plain. And clearly, always a powerful personality.

== Portrayals in other media ==
She was played by three separate actresses in British television, beginning in 1962 with Maxine Audley in an adaptation of "Little Lost Robot" for the TV series Out of This World, then later played by Beatrix Lehmann in the 1967 "The Prophet", and followed by Wendy Gifford in 1969's "Liar!" both being episodes in the series Out of the Unknown.

Harlan Ellison's script for a feature adaptation, begun in 1977 and finished in 1978, would have featured Susan Calvin prominently. The story presents Calvin as a legendary figure, now aged 82. Taking a cue both from the framing sequence of I, Robot and from Citizen Kane, the film would have presented incidents from Calvin's earlier life, in which she would figure prominently, even if absent in the original story. Ellison envisioned the role as a vehicle for Joanne Woodward.

The 2004 film I, Robot was not originally based on Asimov's but had an unrelated script, which was then retrofitted into an adaptation. Here, Calvin is played by Bridget Moynahan.

== References by other writers ==
Arthur C. Clarke mentions Susan Calvin several times alongside Ada Lovelace and Grace Hopper: In his novel 3001: The Final Odyssey she appears as a female "role-model" in "the battle of wits between man and machine" (Chapter 36: Chamber of Horrors); in The Ghost from the Grand Banks Clarke refers to "the small pantheon of famous women programmers" while he puts one of the novel's characters in a league with the three aforementioned ladies (Chapter 4: The Century Syndrome). It is unclear whether Clarke is referring to Calvin in the sense of Asimov's fictional character or as a character who existed in his fictional universe.

Susan Calvin also appears in David Wingrove's illustrated book The Immortals of Science Fiction"(1980). Here she is interviewed, along with nine other famous science fiction characters.

In November 2009, the Isaac Asimov estate announced the upcoming publication a prequel trilogy featuring Susan Calvin authored by fantasy author Mickey Zucker Reichert. The first novel was tentatively named Robots and Chaos. The volumes of the trilogy were published by Penguin Random House in 2011, 2013, and 2016, respectively.

== List of stories by order by publication ==
=== By Asimov ===
- "Liar!" (1941) (first collected in I, Robot)
- "Escape!" (1945) (first collected in I, Robot)
- "Evidence" (1946) (first collected in I, Robot)
- "Little Lost Robot" (1947) (first collected in I, Robot)
- "The Evitable Conflict" (1950) (first collected in I, Robot)
- "Robbie" (1940, revised in 1950) (first collected in I, Robot. The revised version appearing in I, Robot adds a cameo by Calvin, whereas the original story did not.)
- "Satisfaction Guaranteed" (1951) (first collected in Earth Is Room Enough)
- "Risk" (1955) (first collected in The Rest of the Robots)
- "Galley Slave" (1957) (first collected in The Rest of the Robots)
- "Lenny" (1958) (first collected in The Rest of the Robots)
- "Feminine Intuition" (1969) (first collected in The Bicentennial Man and Other Stories)
- "Robot Dreams" (1986) (included in Robot Dreams)

=== By other authors ===
==== Short fiction ====
- "Balance" by Mike Resnick (1989) (included in Foundation's Friends)
- "PAPPI" by Sheila Finch (1989) (included in Foundation's Friends)
- "Plato's Cave" by Poul Anderson (1989) (included in Foundation's Friends)
- "The Fourth Law of Robotics" by Harry Harrison (1989) (included in Foundation's Friends)

==== Novels ====
1. I, Robot: To Protect (2011) by Mickey Zucker Reichert
2. I, Robot: To Obey (2013) by Mickey Zucker Reichert
3. I, Robot: To Preserve (2016) by Mickey Zucker Reichert
