= The Complete Robot =

1982 short story collection by Isaac Asimov

- First edition
- Author: Isaac Asimov
- Cover artist: Kiyoshi Kanai
- Language: English
- Series: Robot series
- Genre: science fiction
- Publisher: Doubleday
- Publication date: 9 April 1982
- Publication place: United States
- Media type: print
- Pages: 557
- ISBN: 0-385-17724-0
- Preceded by: I, Robot
- Followed by: Robot Dreams

The Complete Robot (1982) is a collection of 31 of the 37 science fiction short stories about robots by American writer Isaac Asimov, written between 1939 and 1977. Most of the stories had been previously collected in the books I, Robot and The Rest of the Robots, while four had previously been uncollected and the rest had been scattered across five other anthologies. They share a theme of the interaction of humans, robots and morality, and put together tell a larger story of Asimov's fictional history of robotics. The stories are grouped into categories.

== Contents ==
- Introduction
- Some Non-human Robots
  - "A Boy's Best Friend" (1975)
  - "Sally" (1953)
  - "Someday" (1956), also Multivac series
- Some Immobile Robots
  - "Point of View" (1975), also Multivac series
  - "Think!" (1977)
  - "True Love" (1977), also Multivac series
- Some Metallic Robots
  - "Robot AL-76 Goes Astray" (1942)
  - "Victory Unintentional" (1942)
  - "Stranger in Paradise" (1973–74), novelette
  - "Light Verse" (1973)
  - "Segregationist" (1967)
  - "Robbie" (1940)
- Some Humanoid Robots
  - "Let's Get Together" (1957)
  - "Mirror Image" (1972)
  - "The Tercentenary Incident" (1976)
- Powell and Donovan
  - "First Law" (1956)
  - "Runaround" (1941–42), novelette
  - "Reason" (1941)
  - "Catch That Rabbit" (1944)
- Susan Calvin
  - "Liar!" (1941)
  - "Satisfaction Guaranteed" (1951)
  - "Lenny" (1958)
  - "Galley Slave" (1957), novelette
  - "Little Lost Robot" (1947), novelette
  - "Risk" (1955), novelette
  - "Escape!" (1945)
  - "Evidence" (1946), novelette
  - "The Evitable Conflict" (1950), novelette
  - "Feminine Intuition" (1969), novelette
- Two Climaxes
  - ". . . That Thou Art Mindful of Him" (1974), novelette
  - "The Bicentennial Man" (1976), novelette
- A Last Word

=== Stories not involving the Three Laws of Robotics ===
Stories that are about Asimov's positronic robots that do not obey the Three Laws of Robotics are:

- "Let's Get Together" robots are used as parts of a bomb that will explode when they get together.
- In "Someday" there are non-positronic computers which tell stories and do not obey the Three Laws.
- In "Sally" there are positronic brain cars who can damage men or disobey without problems. No other kinds of robots are seen, and there is no mention of the Three Laws.
- In ". . . That Thou Art Mindful of Him" robots are created with a very flexible Three Laws management, and these create little, simplified robots with no laws that actually act against the Three Laws of Robotics.

=== Robot short stories not included ===
This collection includes most of Asimov's robot short stories. Missing ones were either written after its publication, or formed the text connecting the stories in I, Robot.

The six Asimov robot short stories not included in this book are:

- "Robot Dreams" (found in the anthology of the same title)
- "Robot Visions" (found in the anthology of the same title)
- "Too Bad!" (found in Robot Visions)
- "Christmas Without Rodney" (found in Robot Visions)
- "Cal" (found in Gold)
- "Kid Brother" (found in Gold)

Preceded by I, Robot	Robot series Foundation Series	Succeeded by Robot Dreams
