= Sally (short story) =

- Short story by Isaac Asimov
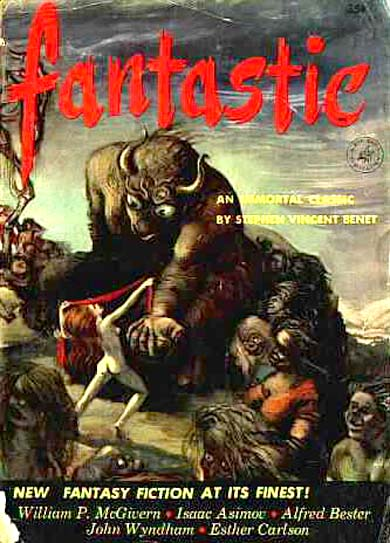
- May–June 1953 issue of Fantastic
- Country: United States
- Language: English
- Genre: Science fiction short story

Publication
- Published in: Fantastic
- Publication type: Periodical
- Publisher: Ziff Davis
- Media type: Print
- Publication date: May–June 1953

"Sally" is a science fiction short story by Isaac Asimov. It was first published in the May–June 1953 issue of Fantastic and later appeared in the Asimov collections Nightfall and Other Stories (1969) and The Complete Robot (1982).

== Plot summary ==
In 2057, the only cars allowed on the road are those that contain positronic brains; these are autonomous cars and do not require a human driver. Fifty-one old cars have been retired to a farm run by Jake, where they can be properly cared for. All have names, but only three are identified by Jake. Sally is a vain convertible, possibly a Corvette (the most popular convertible US-made sports car at the time the story was written), and one sedan, Giuseppe, is identified as coming from the Milan factories, where Alfa Romeo was headquartered. The oldest car on the farm is from 2015, a Mat-o-Mot that goes by the name of Matthew, which Jake had once chauffeured. The cars in the farm communicate by slamming doors and honking their horns, and by misfiring, causing audible engine knocking.

Raymond Gellhorn, an unscrupulous businessman, tries to steal some of the cars in order to 'recycle' the brains. He forces Jake at gunpoint to board a bus he has poorly connected to control the vehicle, trying to leave the farm with Jake as a hostage. (Jake describes the bus as suffering the positronic brain equivalent of perpetual migraines.) The cars chase and eventually surround the bus, communicating with it until it opens a door. Jake falls out, and the bus drives off with Gellhorn. Sally takes Jake back to the farm; Gellhorn is found dead in a ditch the next morning, exhausted and run over. The bus is found by the police and is identified by its tire tracks.

The story ends with Jake losing trust in his cars, thinking what the world will become if cars realize that they are effectively enslaved by humans, and revolt.

== Notes ==
Asimov said, "Anyone reading 'Sally' can sense that I feel strongly attracted to the heroine of the story and that this probably reflects something of my own life ... The sexual symbolism is blatant".

In contrast to most of Asimov's Robot stories, 'Sally' does not refer to or describe the Three Laws of Robotics, and may not be set in the same continuity.

Preceded by: "A Boy's Best Friend"	Included in: The Complete Robot; Robot Dreams	Series: Robot series Foundation Series	Followed by: "Someday"
