= The Rest of the Robots =

1964 short story collection by Isaac Asimov

- First edition
- Author: Isaac Asimov
- Cover artist: Thomas Chibbaro
- Language: English
- Series: Robot series
- Genre: Science fiction
- Publisher: Doubleday
- Publication date: 1964
- Publication place: United States
- Media type: Print (hardback)
- Pages: 556

The Rest of the Robots is a collection of eight short stories and two full-length novels by American writer Isaac Asimov, published in 1964. The stories, centred on positronic robots, are all part of the Robot series, most of which take place in the Foundation universe. Another collection of short stories about robots, I, Robot, was re-published in the previous year, which is why Asimov chose to title the collection as The Rest of the Robots. None of the short stories in this collection were in I, Robot, however all of them were later included in The Complete Robot, and both novels about Elijah Baley were also published separately.

The texts in the collection were grouped into four chapters, differentiating their central themes. The first chapter, "The Coming of the Robots", included some of Asimov's earliest robot stories, where the Three Laws of Robotics were not yet explicitly defined.

The following chapter, "The Laws of Robotics", included stories that were written after the explicit formulation of the three laws, however both stories include elements that place them outside the Foundation universe. In the story "First Law", aliens and direct disobedience of the First Law of Robotics are described, while in the other story, "Let's Get Together", robots are used as weapons in the Cold War. The story "Victory Unintentional" in the first chapter also falls outside the Foundation canon, due to the mention of aliens.

The third chapter, "Susan Calvin" includes stories where robopsychologist Dr. Susan Calvin makes an appearance. These four stories are representative of Asimov's robot short stories, following his traditional themes of aversion and distrust of robots by the general public and issues arising from the robots' interpretation of the Three Laws. The final chapter, titled "Lije Baley", consists of the two novels with detective Elijah Baley, whom Asimov affectionately calls Lije.

While the original hardcover edition of this book included the two novels, some paperback editions have included only the eight short stories. Some of these shorter paperback editions, but not all, have been called Eight Stories from the Rest of the Robots.

== Contents ==
- The Coming of the Robots:
  - "Robot AL-76 Goes Astray" (1942)
  - "Victory Unintentional" (1942), Jovians series #2
- The Laws of Robotics:
  - "First Law" (1956)
  - "Let's Get Together" (1957)
- Susan Calvin:
  - "Satisfaction Guaranteed" (1951)
  - "Risk" (1955), novelette
  - "Lenny" (1958)
  - "Galley Slave" (1957), novelette
- Lije Baley:
  - The Caves of Steel (1953), novel
  - The Naked Sun (1956), novel

== Reception ==
Algis Budrys of Galaxy Science Fiction in June 1965 praised the collection as "a fine book of entertainment," but faulted Asimov's extensive annotations, saying they "[suck] the juice out of some very vivacious writing indeed, and [embalm] one of science fiction's most ebullient personalities." In February 1966 he named the book "the single most useful publishing idea of the year".
