= Robot City =

Robot City may refer to:

- Robot City, a fictional city in the 2005 Blue Sky Studios film Robots
- Isaac Asimov's Robot City, a series of science fiction novels written by multiple authors, inspired by Isaac Asimov's Robot series.
  - Robot City (game), a computer game developed by Brooklyn Multimedia and released in 1995, based on the book series
