= Self-parody =

Parody of oneself

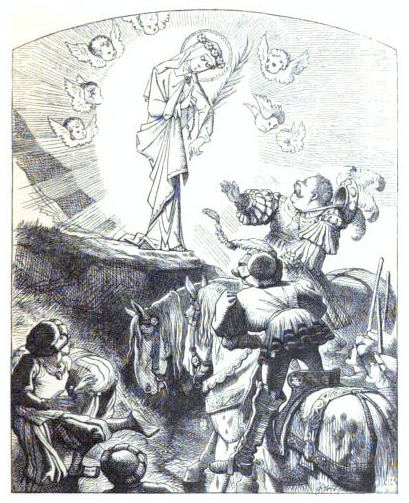
John Tenniel's 1864 illustration for "The Lay of St. Odille" in The Ingoldsby Legends has been called "a very mild and good-natured parody" of his own painting of St. Cecilia (below). In both, the saint rises above the other figures and produces "a spiritual glow". The arc of cherubs replaces the arch with cherubs in St. Cecilia, and the dirt bank replaces a marble pedestal. Also, the fat man at right is taken from a trumpeter in another illustration by Tenniel, for John Milton's "L'Allegro".

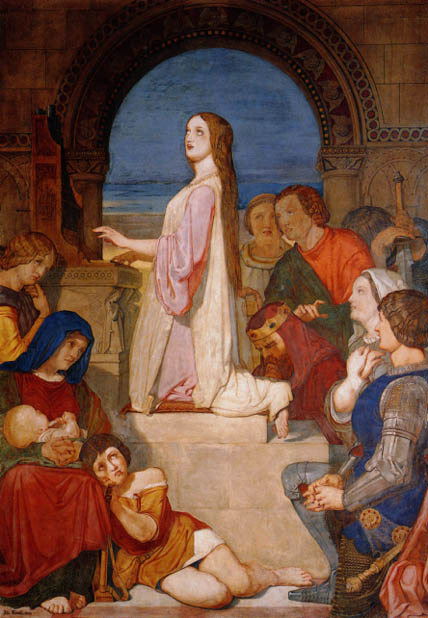
Tenniel's fresco on John Dryden's "Song for Saint Cecilia's Day", c. 1849

A self-parody is a parody of oneself or one's own work. As an artist accomplishes it by imitating their own characteristics, a self-parody is potentially difficult to distinguish from especially characteristic productions. Self-parody may be used to parody someone else's characteristics, or lacking, by overemphasizing and/or exaggerate one's own. Overemphasis can be made for the prevailing attitude in their life's work, social group, lifestyle and subculture. Including lines and points made by others or by the recipient of the self-parody directing it to a parody of someone else which that other person is likely to remember and can't de-emphasize without frustration.

Sometimes critics use the word figuratively to indicate that the artist's style and preoccupations appear as strongly (and perhaps as ineptly) in some work as they would in a parody. Such works may result from habit, self-indulgence, or an effort to please an audience by providing something familiar. An example from Paul Johnson writing about Ernest Hemingway:

Some [of Hemingway's later writing] was published nonetheless, and was seen to be inferior, even a parody of his earlier work. There were one or two exceptions, notably The Old Man and the Sea, though there was an element of self-parody in that too.

== Examples of self-parody ==
The following are deliberate self-parodies or are at least sometimes considered to be so.

=== Literature ===
- In One Thousand and One Nights, the fictional storyteller Sheherezade sometimes tells folk tales with similar themes and story lines that can be seen as parodies of each other. For example, "Wardan the Butcher's Adventure With the Lady and the Bear" parallels "The King's Daughter and the Ape", "Harun al-Rashid and the Two Slave-Girls" has a similar relationship to "Harun al-Rashid and the Three Slave-Girls" - and "The Angel of Death With the Proud King and the Devout Man" has two possible parodies: "The Angel of Death and the Rich King" and "The Angel of Death and the King of the Children of Israel". This observation needs to be tempered by our knowledge of the nature of folk tales, and the way this collection "grew" rather than being deliberately compiled.
- Chaucer's "Tale of Sir Topas" in The Canterbury Tales shows "Geoffrey Chaucer" as a timid writer of doggerel. It has been argued that the tale parodies, among other romances, Chaucer's own Troilus and Criseyde.
- "Nephelidia", a poem by A. C. Swinburne.
- "Municipal", a poem by Rudyard Kipling.
- "L'Art" and "To Hulme (T. E.) and Fitzgerald (A Certain)", poems by Ezra Pound.
- "Afternoon of a Cow", a short story by William Faulkner.
- Edgar Allan Poe often discussed his own work, sometimes in the form of parody, as in "How to Write a Blackwood Article" and the short story that follows it, "A Predicament".
- Pale Fire is a novel by Vladimir Nabokov in the form of a long, pedantic, self-centered commentary on a much shorter poem. It may parody his commentary on his translation of Pushkin's Eugene Onegin, in which the commentary was highly detailed and much longer than the poem. Both the poet and the commentator have been called self-parodies.
- The short story "First Law" by Isaac Asimov is described by Asimov himself as a "spoof" in The Complete Robot.

=== Film and television ===
- Enchanted is a Disney movie which is both a homage to, and self-parody of, previous animated Disney films featuring princesses.
- Arnold Schwarzenegger as Jack Slater in the film Last Action Hero. Slater uses many of Schwarzenegger's action star characterizations including saying one-liners. Schwarzenegger even cameos as himself at the on-screen Slater film premiere.
- Bruce Campbell portrays himself as a B-movie actor who is called to fight a spirit who turns out to be real in My Name is Bruce.
- Chris Kattan portrays himself as an actor who reinvents his career in Bollywood Hero.
- James Van Der Beek portrays himself as the title character's friend in the sitcom Don't Trust the B— in Apartment 23.
- Larry David plays a fictionalised and exaggerated version of himself in the television series Curb Your Enthusiasm.
- Kevin Hart portrays himself as an aspiring action star in the series Die Hart.
- Maria Bamford portrays herself in the Netflix sitcom Lady Dynamite.
- Matt LeBlanc plays a satirical version of himself in Episodes.
- Mike Tyson voices and spoofs himself as a former boxer who becomes a detective in the adult cartoon Mike Tyson Mysteries.
- Neil Patrick Harris in the Harold & Kumar series, where he plays "an extreme version of himself who enjoys drugs, female hookers and alcohol etc."
- Nicolas Cage portrays himself in the film The Unbearable Weight of Massive Talent.
- Richard Dawson as Damon Killian in the film The Running Man. Dawson parodies his Family Feud persona as the film's game show host.
- Rob Schneider portrays himself in the self-produced sitcom Real Rob, which also stars his real-life wife and child.
- Samuel L. Jackson as Agent Neville Flynn in Snakes on a Plane.
- The 1990 film The Freshman features Marlon Brando playing a parody of his famous character from The Godfather.
- The later James Bond films, specifically those with Roger Moore and Pierce Brosnan in the title role, have been called self-parodies.
- The Scary Movie film franchise parodies the popular horror film genre. Scary Movie V parodies the Scary Movie franchise itself.
- The 2023 film Barbie, directed by Greta Gerwig and starring Margot Robbie, is an extended self-parody of the Barbie toy franchise.
- The penultimate episode of Avatar: The Last Airbender, "The Ember Island Players", involves the main characters watching a play of their own journey. The play itself is a self-parody of the entire story of Avatar: The Last Airbender up to that point.
- The Johnny Test season 4 episode, "Johnny Re-Animated" revolves around a cartoon entitled Dawg and Bone, a self-parody of the show itself

=== Video games ===
- In Nintendo's Luigi's Mansion games, the character Professor E. Gadd presents Luigi with a communication device designed as a parody of a Nintendo portable console, as such the "Game Boy Horror" in the original title, the "Duel Scream" in Luigi's Mansion: Dark Moon, and the "Virtual Boo" in Luigi's Mansion 3.
- Konami's Parodius games parody their own Gradius games, as well as several other games they have created. Similar games from other companies that parody their own games include Hudson Soft's Star Parodier and Taito's Space Invaders '95.

== See also ==
- Poe's law
- Cameo appearance
- In-joke
- Mockumentary
- Reality television
- Self-insertion
- Typecasting (acting)
