= Lenny (short story) =

- Short story by Isaac Asimov
- Country: United States
- Language: English
- Genre: Science fiction

Publication
- Published in: Infinity Science Fiction
- Publisher: Royal Publications
- Media type: Magazine
- Publication date: January 1958

Chronology
- Series: Robot series
Satisfaction Guaranteed	Galley Slave

"Lenny" is a science fiction short story by American writer Isaac Asimov, originally published in the January 1958 issue of Infinity Science Fiction, and included in the collections The Rest of the Robots (1964), The Complete Robot (1982), and Robot Visions (1990). As in many of Asimov's robot stories, prejudice is an important theme in "Lenny".

== Plot summary ==
U.S. Robots is planning the production of the LNE series of robots, which are designed for boron mining in the asteroid belt. After a technician neglects to lock a terminal, a factory tourist accidentally reprograms the prototype LNE, wiping clean the structure of the robot's brain, and rendering it a baby in all effects.

Robopsychologist Susan Calvin experiments with it, in the process naming it "Lenny" (and developing maternal feelings for it), and after a month, has been able to teach it a few simple words and actions. She gets emotionally attached to Lenny and realizes that robots can be built that are able to learn, instead of being built for a fixed and specific purpose.

Complications arise when Lenny, unaware of its own force, breaks the arm of a computing technician, which is about to cause widespread "robots attacking humans" panic. However, Susan Calvin manages to exploit the sense of danger to add a new thrill of robotic investigation, just as happens with space exploration or radiation physics.

== Harlan Ellison's screenplay ==
The Harlan Ellison screenplay I, Robot, based on Asimov's Robot stories, would greatly expand Lenny's role and link "Lenny" to "Evidence". The latter short story concerns Stephen Byerley, a politician who has been accused of being a robot and therefore ineligible for office. The original short story never explicitly states whether or not Byerley is a human. However, the screenplay reveals that Byerley is not just a robot, but Lenny in disguise.

Preceded by: "Satisfaction Guaranteed"	Included in: The Rest of the Robots; The Complete Robot	Series: Robot series Foundation Series	Followed by: "Galley Slave"
