= Stranger in Paradise (short story) =

Short story by Isaac Asimov

- Short story by Isaac Asimov
- Country: United States
- Language: English
- Genre: Science fiction

Publication
- Published in: If
- Publisher: UPD Publishing
- Media type: Magazine
- Publication date: May–June 1974

"Stranger in Paradise" is a science fiction short story by American writer Isaac Asimov. It was written in the summer of 1973 for an anthology of original stories edited by Judy-Lynn del Rey, but was rejected by her. It was also rejected by Ben Bova for Analog Science Fiction and Fact before being accepted for If magazine, where it appeared in the May–June 1974 issue. The story was reprinted in the collections The Bicentennial Man and Other Stories (1976) and The Complete Robot (1982).

== Plot summary ==
Anthony Smith and William Anti-Aut are full brothers who live in a "Post-Catastrophe" world where, due to concerns about humanity's limited genetic diversity, siblings who share both parents are rare (and identical twins are nonexistent). Not only are they full brothers, they also look alike, which is totally unheard of, not to mention embarrassing.

William pursues a career in genetic engineering, referred to as homology, and has been trying to understand and cure autism, hence his chosen surname. Anthony has gone into telemetrics, and is working on the Mercury Project, the purpose of which is to send a robot to Mercury. This is a problem because the positronic brain at the time is not yet adapted to such an environment, so a computer on Earth must direct the robot. However, the speed of light communications lag between Earth and Mercury can last up to twenty-two minutes, making computer control difficult. Anthony attempts to solve this problem by recruiting a homologist that can design a positronic brain that resembles a human brain. The leading homologist in this area is his brother William, and much to their mutual embarrassment, the two wind up working together.

William struggles to help form the brain, but when the robot is tested in Arizona, it is terribly clumsy. Anthony sees no hope in the robot, but William argues that it was designed for the environment of Mercury, not Arizona. When the robot is sent to Mercury, it operates smoothly, and the project is a success. The solution, William realized, was to use an autistic human rather than a computer to direct the robot. The story ends with William and Anthony befriending each other after being so long separated.
