= Robot AL-76 Goes Astray =

- Short story by Isaac Asimov
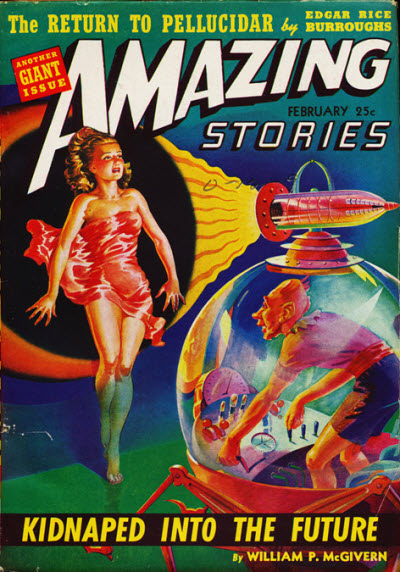
- Country: United States
- Language: English
- Genre: Science fiction

Publication
- Published in: Amazing Stories
- Publication type: Periodical
- Publisher: Ziff-Davis
- Media type: Print (Magazine, Hardback & Paperback)
- Publication date: February 1942

Chronology
- Series: Robot series
Robbie	First Law

"Robot AL-76 Goes Astray" is a humorous science fiction short story by American writer Isaac Asimov, originally published in the February 1942 issue of Amazing Stories and included in the collections The Rest of the Robots (1964) and The Complete Robot (1982). Asimov selected the story for inclusion in the 1949 anthology My Best Science Fiction Story.

== Plot summary ==
AL-76 (also known as Al) is a robot designed for mining work on the Moon, but as a result of an accident after leaving the factory of US Robots and Mechanical Men, it gets lost and finds itself in rural Virginia. It cannot comprehend the unfamiliar environment and the people it meets are scared of it. When it comes across a shed full of spare parts and junk, it is moved to reprogram itself and builds a powerful mining tool of the kind it was designed to use on the Moon – but since it does not have the proper parts, it improvises and produces a better model, requiring less power. Al then proceeds to disintegrate half of a mountainside with it, in no time at all: much to the alarm of a country "antique dealer" who had hoped to use the lost robot in his business. When angrily told to destroy the tool and forget all about it, AL-76 obeys, and the secret of the reprogramming and the improved tool is lost.

Preceded by: "Robbie"	Included in: The Rest of the Robots; The Complete Robot	Series: Robot series Foundation Series	Followed by: "First Law"
