= Robbie (short story) =

Science fiction short story by American writer Isaac Asimov

- Short story by Isaac Asimov
- Country: United States
- Language: English
- Genre: Science fiction

Publication
- Published in: Super Science Stories
- Publication type: Periodical
- Publisher: Popular Publications
- Media type: Print (magazine, hardback, paperback)
- Publication date: September 1940

Chronology
- Series: Robot series
—	Robot AL-76 Goes Astray

"Robbie" is a science fiction short story by American writer Isaac Asimov. It was the first of Asimov's positronic robot stories. In 2016, "'Robbie" won a retrospective 1941 Hugo Award for best short story. "Robbie" was the fourteenth story written by Asimov, and the ninth to be published. It was the first story in Asimov's Robot series.

== Significance ==
Central to the story is the technophobia that surrounds robots, and how it is misplaced. Almost all previously published science fiction stories featuring robots had followed the theme of robot turning against their creator, in common with the monster featured in Mary Shelley's novel Frankenstein. Asimov has consistently held the belief that the Frankenstein complex was a misplaced fear. The majority of Asimov's works concerning robots attempted to provide examples of the help that they could render for humanity.

== History ==
Asimov began writing the story on June 10, 1939. He was inspired to write a story about a sympathetic robot by the story "I, Robot" by Otto Binder, which had recently been published in the January 1939 issue of Amazing Stories.

After John W. Campbell of Astounding Science Fiction rejected the story in June, Asimov briefly hired Frederik Pohl as literary agent, but he could not find a magazine to accept it. Pohl then became editor of Astonishing Stories and Super Science Stories in October 1939. In March 1940 Pohl purchased "Robbie" for the latter magazine. For its first publication, Pohl renamed the story “Strange Playfellow,” a title Asimov thought "distasteful".

When the story was reprinted in the first collection of Asimov's robot stories, I, Robot (a title Asimov had not wanted), he had his preferred title of "Robbie" restored. The reprint contained a number of revisions to the text. "Robbie" was later reprinted in The Complete Robot (1982), and Robot Visions (1990).The story was the first of Asimov's positronic robot stories to see publication.

== Plot summary ==
=== Synopsis of 1940 version ===
In the year 1982, a mute robot, nicknamed Robbie, is owned by the Weston family. He serves as a nursemaid for their daughter, Gloria.

Mrs. Weston has become concerned about the effect a robot nursemaid might have on developing social skills and worries that he might malfunction and harm her. Gloria prefers Robbie's company to that of other children. Mr. Weston gives in to his wife's badgering and returns Robbie to the factory. Gloria's parents claim that Robbie had, for no reason, "walked away". They have replaced him with a collie dog called Lightning.

The effort fails. Gloria, missing her best friend, stops enjoying life. Her mother thinks it would be impossible for Gloria to forget Robbie while surrounded by the places where they once played. Mrs. Weston convinces her husband to take them to New York City, where he happens to work. Gloria, getting the wrong idea, optimistically thinks that they are going to the city in search of Robbie.

Among other tourist attractions, the Westons visit the Museum of Science and Industry; Gloria sneaks away to see a "Talking Robot" (in modern terms, a computer), an immobile machine which takes up the whole room. It can answer questions posed to it verbally by visitors. Gloria asks the machine if it has seen Robbie, "a robot... just like you." The computer, unable to comprehend the question, breaks down.

Mr. Weston approaches his wife with the idea of touring a robot factory. Gloria can then see robots as inanimate objects, not "people". During the tour, Mr. Weston asks to see a room where robots make other robots. One of the robot assemblers is Robbie. Gloria runs in front of a moving vehicle in her eagerness to get to her friend, but is rescued by Robbie. Mrs. Weston confronts her husband: he had set up the encounter all along. When Robbie saves Gloria's life, an unplanned part of the reunion, Mrs. Weston relents. The two friends can stay together.

=== 1950 revision ===
The revised version changes the date to 1998 and adds a cameo appearance by Susan Calvin, at that time a college student studying robots, during the Talking Robot scene. Other changes include:

- Ret-con mention of the First Law of Robotics, absent in the original, which instead had an explanation by Mr Weston: "A robot is infinitely more to be trusted than a human nurse-maid. Robbie was constructed for only one purpose—to be the companion of a little child. His entire 'mentality' has been created for the purpose. He just can't help being faithful and loving and kind. He's a machine—made so."
- Robbie's upper appendages are described as hands rather than tentacles.
- The Douglas expedition to the Moon is changed to the Lefebre-Yoshida expedition to Mars.
- Mrs. Weston (and the text) refers to the dog as "it", rather than "he".
- The Finmark Robot Corporation is renamed to U.S. Robots.
- More details are added on the description of the visivox Gloria has seen with her family.
- The reference to Mr. Weston commuting to New York via his private auto-gyro is removed.
- The reference to the effects on Mr Weston's heirloom watch of the powerful electro-magnet is deleted.
- Additional description related to the Talking Robot and its capacities.
- Various sociological comments, such as "[t]here's bad feeling in the village" and a reference to unions and dislocation (replacing a reference to Mr. Struthers' speech on "Robots and the Future of the Human Being"), are interpolated. A reference to a law restricting robots on public streets is moved.
- Mrs. Weston's justification for her conclusion that Mr. Weston engineered the reunion, starting with "Robbie wasn't designed for engineering or construction work," is interpolated.

== Adaptations ==
The story was broadcast as episode one of a five-part 15 Minute Drama radio adaptation of I, Robot on BBC Radio 4 in February 2017.

== Reception ==
Groff Conklin called the story "completely charming".

Apart from winning the 1941 Retro-Hugo Award for the Best Short Story, "Robbie" was voted 29th in the 2012 Locus Poll of Best 20th Century Short Stories.
