= The Tercentenary Incident =

- Short story by Isaac Asimov
- Country: United States
- Language: English
- Genre: Science fiction/mystery

Publication
- Published in: Ellery Queen's Mystery Magazine
- Publication type: Periodical
- Publisher: Davis Publications
- Media type: Print (Magazine)
- Publication date: August 1976

"The Tercentenary Incident" is a science fiction/mystery short story by American writer Isaac Asimov. It was first published in the August 1976 issue of Ellery Queen's Mystery Magazine, and reprinted in the collections The Bicentennial Man and Other Stories (1976) and The Complete Robot (1982).

Ellery Queen's Mystery Magazine editor Frederic Dannay contacted Asimov in the fall of 1975 with a story proposal: the August 1976 issue, which would be on the stands during the United States Bicentennial, would include a contemporary mystery set in 1976 and a historical mystery set in 1876. He wanted a science fiction mystery set in 2076, and Asimov agreed to write one. Asimov's original title for the story was "Death at the Tercentenary", but when the story appeared he decided he liked Dannay's title better.

The concept of a robot taking political office in the guise of a human was also the theme of Asimov's 1946 story, "Evidence". Edwards theory about the robots motivation is similar to The Zeroth Law of Robotics, having been speculated upon earlier in The Evitable Conflict and later elaborated on in Robots and Empire.

== Plot summary ==
This story begins on 4 July 2076. The United States itself is no longer a sovereign country, but part of a Global Federation. The beginning of the story details the Tercentenary speech by the 57th president, Hugo Allen Winkler, who is described by Secret Service agent Lawrence Edwards as a "vote-grabber, a promiser" who has failed to get anything done during his first term in office. While moving through a crowd near the Washington Monument, the President suddenly disappears in a "glitter of dust". He reappears very shortly afterwards on a guarded stage and gives a stirring speech which is quite different from the kind he usually makes. Edwards is reminded of rumors of a robot double of the President existing as a security measure, and concludes that the double was assassinated.

Two years after that occurrence, the now retired Edwards contacts the President’s personal secretary, a man named Janek, convinced that it was not the robot double who had died at the Tercentenary, but the President himself, with the robot having then taken office. Edwards points to rumors of an experimental weapon, a disintegrator, and suggests this is the weapon used to assassinate Winkler, as not only does its effect mirror that seen at the Tercentenary, but also made examination of the corpse impossible. He argues that the robot duplicate, posing as the President, retrieved the disintegrator and arranged the assassination. Following the incident, the President has become much more effective, but as Edwards points out, he has also become more reclusive, even towards his own children. The robot, Edward claims, must have concluded that Winkler was too ineffectual to serve as President. The death of one man was acceptable to save three billion, and this is what allowed it to circumvent the First Law of Robotics.

Edwards implores Janek, as the President’s closest confidante, to confirm his suspicions and convince the robot to resign, worrying about the precedent set by having a robot ruler.

Following the meeting, Janek decides to have Edwards eliminated to keep him from going public with his findings, and the story ends with the revelation that Janek was the man behind the assassination of the President.
