= Reason (short story) =

Science fiction short story by American writer Isaac Asimov

- Short story by Isaac Asimov
- Country: United States
- Language: English
- Genre: Science fiction

Publication
- Published in: Astounding Science Fiction
- Publisher: Street & Smith
- Media type: Magazine
- Publication date: April 1941

Chronology
- Series: Robot series
Runaround	Catch that Rabbit

"Reason" is a science fiction short story by American writer Isaac Asimov, first published in the April 1941 issue of Astounding Science Fiction and collected in I, Robot (1950), The Complete Robot (1982), and Robot Visions (1990). It is part of Asimov's Robot series, and was the second of Asimov's positronic robot stories to see publication.

== Plot summary ==
Powell and Donovan are assigned to a space station which supplies energy via microwave beams to the planets. The robots that control the energy beams are in turn co-ordinated by QT-1, known to Powell and Donovan as Cutie, an advanced model with highly developed reasoning ability. Using these abilities, Cutie decides that space, stars and the planets beyond the station do not really exist, and that the humans that visit the station are unimportant, short-lived and expendable. QT-1 makes the lesser robots disciples of a new religion, which considers the power source of the ship to be "Master". QT-1 teaches them to bow down to the "Master" and intone, "There is no master but Master, and QT-1 is His prophet." Disregarding human commands as inferior, QT-1 asserts "I myself, exist, because I think". The sardonic response of the humans is, "Oh, Jupiter, a robot Descartes!"

The humans initially attempt to reason with QT-1, until they realize that they cannot convince it otherwise. Their attempts to remove Cutie physically also fail, as the other robots have become disciples and refuse to obey human orders. The situation seems desperate, as a solar storm is expected, potentially deflecting the energy beam, incinerating populated areas. When the storm hits, Powell and Donovan are amazed to find that the beam operates perfectly.

Cutie, however, does not believe that they did anything other than maintain meter readings at optimum, according to the commands of The Master. As far as Cutie and the rest of the robots are concerned, solar storms and planets are non-existent. The two thus come to the realization that, although the robots themselves were not consciously aware of doing so, they had been following the first and second laws all along. Cutie knew, on some level, that it would be better suited to operate the controls than Powell or Donavan, so, lest it endanger humans and break the first law by obeying their orders, it subconsciously orchestrated a scenario where it would be in control of the beam.

Powell and Donovan realize that there is no need to do anything for the rest of their tour of duty. Cutie's religion cannot be eliminated, but since the robot performs its job just as well, it is moot, even if Cutie continues to perform his duties for a perceived deity, rather than for the benefit of the humans. The humans begin to consider how they might spread the notion to other groups of robots which need to work as teams.

== Notes ==
Asimov wrote "Reason" in October and November 1940. John W. Campbell purchased it on 22 November—his third from Asimov, and the first he did not ask for a revision of—and published it in the April 1941 issue of Astounding Science Fiction.

== Adaptations ==
The story was broadcast as episode two of a five-part 15 Minute Drama radio adaptation of I, Robot on BBC Radio 4 in February 2017.

In 1967, this short story was adapted into an episode of British television series Out of the Unknown entitled "The Prophet". Although audio extracts, tele-snaps and production stills exist, the episode itself was wiped and is now considered lost. The robot costumes that were used in this particular episode of the anthology series were later re-used for an episode of Thirty-Minute Theatre called The Metal Martyr (which also doesn't exist beyond photographs and audio extracts) and the Doctor Who serial The Mind Robber. The costumes were re-painted from black to grey and yellow, as they were to be shot against a completely white backdrop for the serial in question.

Preceded by: "Runaround"	Included in: I, Robot; The Complete Robot	Series: Robot series Foundation Series	Followed by: "Catch That Rabbit"
