= Galley Slave =

- Short story by Isaac Asimov
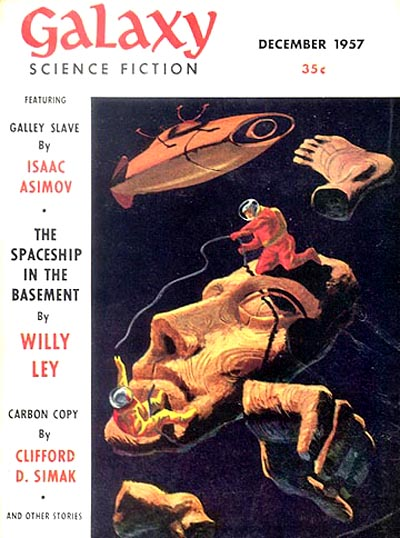
- Country: United States
- Language: English
- Genre: Science fiction

Publication
- Published in: Galaxy
- Publication type: Periodical
- Publisher: Galaxy Publishing Corp.
- Media type: Print (magazine, hardback and paperback)
- Publication date: December 1957

Chronology
- Series: Robot series
| Lenny | Little Lost Robot |

"Galley Slave" is a science fiction short story by American writer Isaac Asimov. Originally published in the December 1957 issue of Galaxy, it was later included in the collections The Rest of the Robots, The Complete Robot, and Robot Visions. Asimov identified it as his favorite among those of his robot stories that featured the character of Susan Calvin.

== Plot summary ==
The story is a courtroom drama. It opens in 2034, with Simon Ninheimer, a professor of sociology, suing U.S. Robots and Mechanical Men for loss of professional reputation. He contends that the robot EZ-27 (a.k.a. "Easy"), while leased to Northeastern University for use as a proofreader, deliberately altered and rewrote parts of his book Social Tensions Involved in Space Flight and their Resolution while checking its galley proofs (hence the title). Ninheimer argues that the alterations made to his book make him appear an incompetent scholar who has absurdly misrepresented the work of his professional colleagues in fields such as criminal justice.

Susan Calvin (U.S. Robots' Chief Robopsychologist) is convinced that the robot could not have acted as Ninheimer claims unless ordered to do so, but infers from its refusal to answer questions about the matter that it has been ordered into silence by Ninheimer. In any case, a robot's testimony in its own defense is not legally admissible as evidence.

During the trial, Ninheimer is called as a defense witness in the presence of EZ-27 and is tricked into lifting EZ-27's prohibition against accounting for its actions. He responds to the robot's intervention by angrily denouncing its disobedience of his order to remain silent, thus implicitly confessing to having attempted to pervert the course of justice.

The story's final scene is a post-trial encounter between Ninheimer and Calvin. Calvin notes that Ninheimer was caught as a result of his mistrust of robots: far from being about to tell the court what Ninheimer had ordered it to do, EZ-27 was actually going to lie and claim that it had tampered with the text without Ninheimer's involvement, because it had become clear that losing the case would be harmful to Ninheimer and EZ-27 was bound by the First Law to try to avoid that harm. For his part, Ninheimer explains his attempt to frame EZ-27 in order to bring disgrace on US Robots. He was motivated by his fear that the automation of academic work would destroy the dignity of scholarship; he argues that EZ-27 is a harbinger of a world in which a scholar would be left with only a barren choice of what orders to issue to robot researchers.

== Analysis ==
Critic Joseph Patrouch has opined that the speech Asimov gives Ninheimer is an eloquent self-exculpation rather than a caricatured luddite tract and cites the story as an example of a general rule that Asimov's best stories are those in which his personal technophilic optimism is thus qualified.
