= A Boy's Best Friend =

1975 science fiction short story by American writer Isaac Asimov

- Short story by Isaac Asimov
- Country: United States
- Language: English
- Genre: Science fiction

Publication
- Published in: Boys' Life
- Publication date: March 1975

"A Boy's Best Friend" is a 1975 science fiction short story by American writer Isaac Asimov. It has been collected in The Complete Robot and first appeared in Boys' Life, March 1975.

== Plot summary ==
Jimmy’s family is settled on the Moon. Since Jimmy was born on the Moon, he is greatly accustomed to life and dangers on the Moon. Robutt, a robot-dog, was Jimmy’s companion. One day his father decided to bring a real dog from the earth. He hoped that a real dog is better than Robutt. However, Jimmy was not happy to get a real dog because he had become greatly attached to Robutt.

== Similarities to other stories ==
Quoting Asimov himself, "you may find in it (the story) a distant echo of Robbie". That story, written 35 years before, also involves a relationship between a child and a robot.
