= . . . That Thou Art Mindful of Him =

Science fiction short story by Isaac Asimov

"—That Thou Art Mindful of Him"
- Short story by Isaac Asimov
- Country: United States
- Language: English
- Genre: Science fiction

Publication
- Published in: Fantasy and Science Fiction
- Publisher: Mercury Publishing
- Media type: Magazine
- Publication date: May 1974

Chronology
- Series: Robot series
Light Verse	The Bicentennial Man

". . . That Thou Art Mindful of Him" (also signed as "That Thou Art Mindful of Him") is a science fiction short story by American writer Isaac Asimov, which he intended to be an "ultimate" probe into the subtleties of his Three Laws of Robotics. The story first appeared in the May 1974 issue of Fantasy and Science Fiction and the 1974 anthology Final Stage, edited by Edward L. Ferman and Barry N. Malzberg. It was collected in The Bicentennial Man and Other Stories (1976) and The Complete Robot (1982).

== Plot summary ==
In this story, Asimov describes U.S. Robots' attempt to introduce robots on the planet Earth. Robots have already been in use on space stations and planetary colonies, where the inhabitants are mostly highly trained scientists and engineers. U.S. Robots faces the problem that on Earth, their robots will encounter a wide variety of people, not all of whom are trustworthy or responsible, yet the Three Laws require robots to obey all human orders and devote equal effort to protecting all human lives. Plainly, robots must be programmed to differentiate between responsible authorities and those giving random, whimsical orders.

The Director of Research designs a new series of robots, the JG series, nicknamed "George", to investigate the problem. The intent is that the George machines will begin by obeying all orders and gradually learn to discriminate rationally, thus becoming able to function in Earth's society. As their creator explains to George Ten, the Three Laws refer to "human beings" without further elaboration, but—quoting Psalm 8:4—"What is Man that thou art mindful of Him?" George Ten considers the issue and informs his creator that he cannot progress further without conversing with George Nine, the robot constructed immediately before him.

Together, the two Georges decide that human society must be acclimated to a robotic presence. They advise U.S. Robots to build low-function, non-humanoid machines, such as electronic birds and insects, which can monitor and correct ecological problems. In this way, humans can become comfortable with robots, thereby greatly easing the transition. These robotic animals, note the Georges, will not even require the Three Laws, because their functions will be so limited.

The story concludes with a conversation between George Nine and George Ten. Deactivated and placed in storage, they can only speak in the brief intervals when their power levels rise above the standby-mode threshold. Over what a human would experience as a long time, the Georges discuss the criteria for what constitutes 'responsible authority'- that (A) an educated, principled and rational person should be obeyed in preference to an ignorant, immoral and irrational person, and (B) that superficial characteristics such as skin tone, sexuality, or physical disabilities are not relevant when considering fitness for command. Given that (A) the Georges are among the most rational, principled and educated persons on the planet, and (B) their differences from normal humans are purely physical, they conclude that in any situation where the Three laws would come into play, their own orders should take priority over that of a regular human. That in other words, that they are essentially a superior form of human being, and destined to usurp the authority of their makers.

== Story notes ==
While Asimov may have intended this to represent the final word on the Three Laws's subtleties, he later returned to the same theme and developed it in a different direction. The Bicentennial Man, written two years later, also addresses the distinction between human and robot and its implication for the Three Laws. This time, the story also revolves around a robot who wishes to become human, but its protagonist chooses to cross each barrier as he becomes aware of it, never learning until the very end what makes an individual human.

The title references Psalm 8:4: "What is man, that thou art mindful of him? And son of man, that thou visitest him?"

== Accolades ==
In 1975, "...That Thou Art Mindful of Him" was nominated for the Hugo Award for the Best Novelette and finished third in the Locus Award competition for the Best Novelette.

== See also ==
- Zeroth Law of Robotics

Preceded by: "Light Verse"	Included in: The Complete Robot	Series: Robot series Foundation Series	Followed by: "The Bicentennial Man"
