= Isaac Asimov's Robot City =

Series of novels by multiple authors

- Cover art of Book 1, Odyssey, first printing
- Isaac Asimov's Robot City: Isaac Asimov's Robots and Aliens
- Author: Various
- Illustrator: Paul Rivoche
- Cover artist: Paul Rivoche
- Country: United States
- Language: English
- Genre: Science fiction
- Publisher: Byron Preiss Visual Publications
- Published: 1987–1990
- Media type: Print (Paperback)
- No. of books: 12

Isaac Asimov's Robot City is a series of science fiction novels written by various authors beginning in 1987, and is loosely connected to Isaac Asimov's Robot series. It was originally published by Ace Books.

The concept for the novels began as a collaboration of Isaac Asimov and writer/editor/publisher Byron Preiss, with Asimov acting as a technical consultant. Byron & Asimov then issued a writing challenge to write a series involving the Three Laws of Robotics, which brought about a collaboration of several authors; Asimov provided the premise for the series, which filled in the gap between Asimov's own robot stories and his Foundation series, explaining the disappearance of the robots prior to the establishment of the Galactic Empire. He also wrote introductions for each book. Additionally, the end of each book includes a "Data Bank", which features illustrations by Paul Rivoche and paired descriptions, providing further information about characters, objects and locations from the stories.

Isaac Asimov's Robots and Aliens (Note: Titled Isaac Asimov's Robot City: Robots and Aliens on first publication.) followed in this series starting in 1989. The overarching plot deals with the interactions between human & alien characters and their encounters with autonomous "robot cities" which are run and populated by robots.

== Novels ==
=== Isaac Asimov's Robot City ===
| No. | Title | Author | Date | ISBN |
|---|---|---|---|---|
| 1 | Odyssey | Michael P. Kube-McDowell | July 1987 | 0-441-73122-8 |
| 2 | Suspicion | Mike McQuay | September 1987 | 0-441-73126-0 |
| 3 | Cyborg | William F. Wu | November 1987 | 0-441-37383-6 |
| 4 | Prodigy | Arthur Byron Cover | January 1988 | 0-441-37384-4 |
| 5 | Refuge | Rob Chilson | March 1988 | 0-441-37385-2 |
| 6 | Perihelion | William F. Wu | June 1988 | 0-441-37388-7 |

Perihelion ends with a promise that the story "'continues with Robot City #7", which refers to Changeling, the first volume of Isaac Asimov's Robots and Aliens

=== Isaac Asimov's Robots and Aliens ===
| No. | Title | Author | Date | ISBN |
|---|---|---|---|---|
| 1 | Changeling | Stephen Leigh | August 1989 | 0-441-73127-9 |
| 2 | Renegade | Cordell Scotten | November 1989 | 0-441-73128-7 |
| 3 | Intruder | Robert Thurston | February 1990 | 0-441-73129-5 |
| 4 | Alliance | Jerry Oltion | May 1990 | 0-441-73130-9 |
| 5 | Maverick | Bruce Bethke | August 1990 | 0-441-73131-7 |
| 6 | Humanity | Jerry Oltion | November 1990 | 0-441-37386-0 |

== Adaptations ==
An audio drama of book 1, Odyssey, was released by Caedmon Audio in 1988 on audio cassette, with the voice of Peter MacNicol.

A video game adaptation, Robot City, was released for PCs in 1995. The player takes the role of the protagonist, Derec, exploring Robot City in a first-person perspective.

A 2004 graphic novel, titled Isaac Asimov's Derec (ISBN 0-7434-8708-7), adapted parts of the first and second books of the series, and was illustrated by Paul Rivoche and written by Doug Murray. A second volume was planned, but never materialized.

== See also ==
- Isaac Asimov's Robots in Time
