= The Bicentennial Man and Other Stories =

1976 anthology by Isaac Asimov

- First edition
- Author: Isaac Asimov
- Cover artist: Peter Rauch
- Language: English
- Genre: Science fiction
- Publisher: Doubleday
- Publication date: September 1976
- Publication place: United States
- Media type: Print (hardback & paperback)
- Pages: 211
- ISBN: 0-385-12198-9
- OCLC: 2202354
- Dewey Decimal: 813/.5/4
- LC Class: PZ3.A8316 Bi PS3551.S5
- Preceded by: Buy Jupiter and Other Stories
- Followed by: The Winds of Change and Other Stories

The Bicentennial Man and Other Stories is a science fiction anthology written and edited by Isaac Asimov. Following the usual form for Asimov collections, it consists of eleven short stories and a poem surrounded by commentary describing how each came to be written. The collection was voted 5th in the 1977 Locus Award competition for the Best Author Collection, while the titular novelette won Hugo, Nebula, and Locus Awards for the Best Novelette.

Five of the stories are Robot stories, while one is a Multivac story.

== Contents ==
The stories are as follows (original publication in parentheses):

- "The Prime of Life" (F&SF, October 1966), poem
- "Feminine Intuition" (F&SF, October 1969), novelette, Robot series
- "Waterclap" (Galaxy, May 1970), novelette
- "That Thou Art Mindful of Him" (F&SF, May 1974), novelette, Robot series
- "Stranger in Paradise" (If, May–June 1974), novelette, Robot series
- "The Life and Times of Multivac" (New York Times Magazine, [Sunday] 5 January 1975), Multivac series
- "The Winnowing" (Analog, February 1976)
- "The Bicentennial Man" (Judy-Lynn del Rey, ed., Stellar Science Fiction #2, February 1976), novelette, Robot series
- "Marching In" (High Fidelity magazine, April 1976)
- "Old-fashioned" (Bell Telephone Magazine, February 1976)
- "The Tercentenary Incident" (Ellery Queen's Mystery Magazine, August 1976), Robot series
- "Birth of a Notion" (Amazing Stories, April 1976)

Two of the stories, "Feminine Intuition" and "The Bicentennial Man", were inspired by Judy-Lynn del Rey. The latter was expanded into a novel, The Positronic Man (with Robert Silverberg), which formed the basis of the 1999 Touchstone Pictures and Columbia Pictures film Bicentennial Man.
