= Satisfaction Guaranteed (short story) =

- Short story by Isaac Asimov
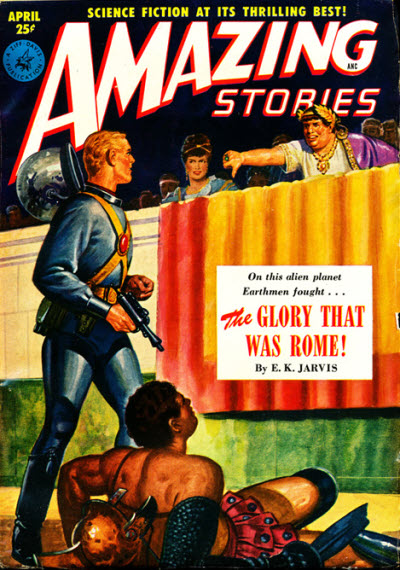
- Country: United States
- Language: English
- Genre: Science fiction

Publication
- Published in: Amazing Stories
- Publication type: Periodical
- Publisher: Ziff Davis
- Media type: Print (Magazine, Hardback & Paperback)
- Publication date: April 1951

Chronology
- Series: Robot series
Liar!	Lenny

"Satisfaction Guaranteed" is a science fiction short story by American writer Isaac Asimov, originally published in the April 1951 issue of Amazing Stories, and included in the collections Earth Is Room Enough (1957), The Rest of the Robots (1964), and The Complete Robot (1982).

== Plot summary ==
Robot TN-3 (also known as Tony) is designed as a humanoid household robot, an attempt by US Robots to get robots accepted in the home. He is placed with Claire Belmont, whose husband works for the company, as an experiment, but she is reluctant to accept him. Tony realizes that Claire has very low self-esteem, and tries to help her by redecorating her house and giving her a make-over. Finally, he pretends to be her lover, and deliberately lets the neighbors see him kissing Claire, thus increasing her self-esteem. In the end, though, Claire falls in love with Tony, and becomes conflicted and ultimately depressed when he is taken back to the lab. The TN-3 robot models are scheduled to be redesigned, since US Robots thinks that they should not produce a model that will appear to fall in love with women. US Robots robopsychologist Susan Calvin dissents, aware that women may nevertheless fall in love with robots.

== Adaptations ==
The story was adapted as an episode of the BBC television series, Out of the Unknown, with Wendy Craig as Claire. The complete episode is lost, although a 2m 27s extract, audio extracts and off-screen photographs exist.

In 2002, the story was adapted for the BBC Radio 4 Afternoon Play slot.

Preceded by: "Liar!"	Included in: The Rest of the Robots; The Complete Robot	Series: Robot series Foundation Series	Followed by: "Lenny"
