= Victory Unintentional =

- Short story by Isaac Asimov
- Country: United States
- Language: English
- Genre: Science fiction

Publication
- Published in: Super Science Stories
- Publisher: Popular Publications
- Media type: Magazine
- Publication date: August 1942

Chronology
- Series: Jovian Menace
Not Final!	—

"Victory Unintentional" is a humorous science fiction short story by American writer Isaac Asimov, published in the August 1942 issue of Super Science Stories and included in the collections The Rest of the Robots (1964) and The Complete Robot (1982).

== Background ==
Written in January and February 1942, "Victory Unintentional" is a sequel to a non-robot story, "Not Final!". John W. Campbell of Astounding Science Fiction so disliked the story that he rejected it with the chemical formula for butyl mercaptan. Campbell knew the chemistry graduate-student Asimov would understand this as saying that the story stank. Asimov sold it to Super Science Stories in March, which published the story in August 1942. It was the last story he wrote for 14 months, as he became busy with graduate school, got a job at the Philadelphia Navy Yard, and met and married Gertrude Blugerman.

== Plot ==
Human colonists on Ganymede send three extremely hardy and durable robots, ZZ One, ZZ Two, and ZZ Three, to explore the physically demanding surface of Jupiter and contact the Jovians.

Initially they are greeted with hostile attempts, though it takes the robots some time to deduce the hostile nature of activities because the attacks are too feeble, but reproduce normal conditions on Earth (e.g., using oxygen to poison the robots). After the initial hostile encounters with both Jupiter's wildlife and the suspicious Jovians, the robots establish a line of communication and are taken on a tour of the Jovian civilization. They quickly discover that the Jovians have a vastly larger population than the humans, since Jupiter has a much greater surface area than Earth. The robots also realize that the Jovians are considerably more advanced scientifically, and that they have developed force field technology far beyond that of humanity. Moreover, the Jovians are culturally inclined to believe themselves superior to the extent that they consider all other life forms, including humans, "vermin". They arrogantly threaten to use their force field technology to leave Jupiter, in order to destroy humanity.

However, as the tour proceeds, the robots repeatedly (and unintentionally) surprise the Jovians with their immunity to extremes of heat, cold and radiation. Because they use gamma radiation for close range vision, they even pose a danger to local microbes and the Jovians themselves. At the conclusion of the tour the Jovians return the robots to their spacecraft, only to be astonished that it does not need to provide them with any protection against outer space. After a flurry of diplomatic activity, the Jovians return to the robots and, unexpectedly, swear eternal peace with humanity, surprising the robots. They quickly retreat back to Earth.

On return from the surface of planet Jupiter, the three robots reflect on this change of heart by the Jovians. ZZ One (with his considerably lower reasoning capacity than the other robots) argues, from the perspective of the First Law, that the Jovians simply realized that they could not harm humans. However, the other two robots intuit the real reason. When the Jovians' superiority complex was confronted by the strength and resistance of the robots to all manner of hazards, it crumbled and led to their acquiescence. ZZ Three thoughtfully realizes that the three robots never thought to mention that they were robots, and the Jovians must have simply mistakenly assumed that they were humans.
