= First Law =

- Short story by Isaac Asimov
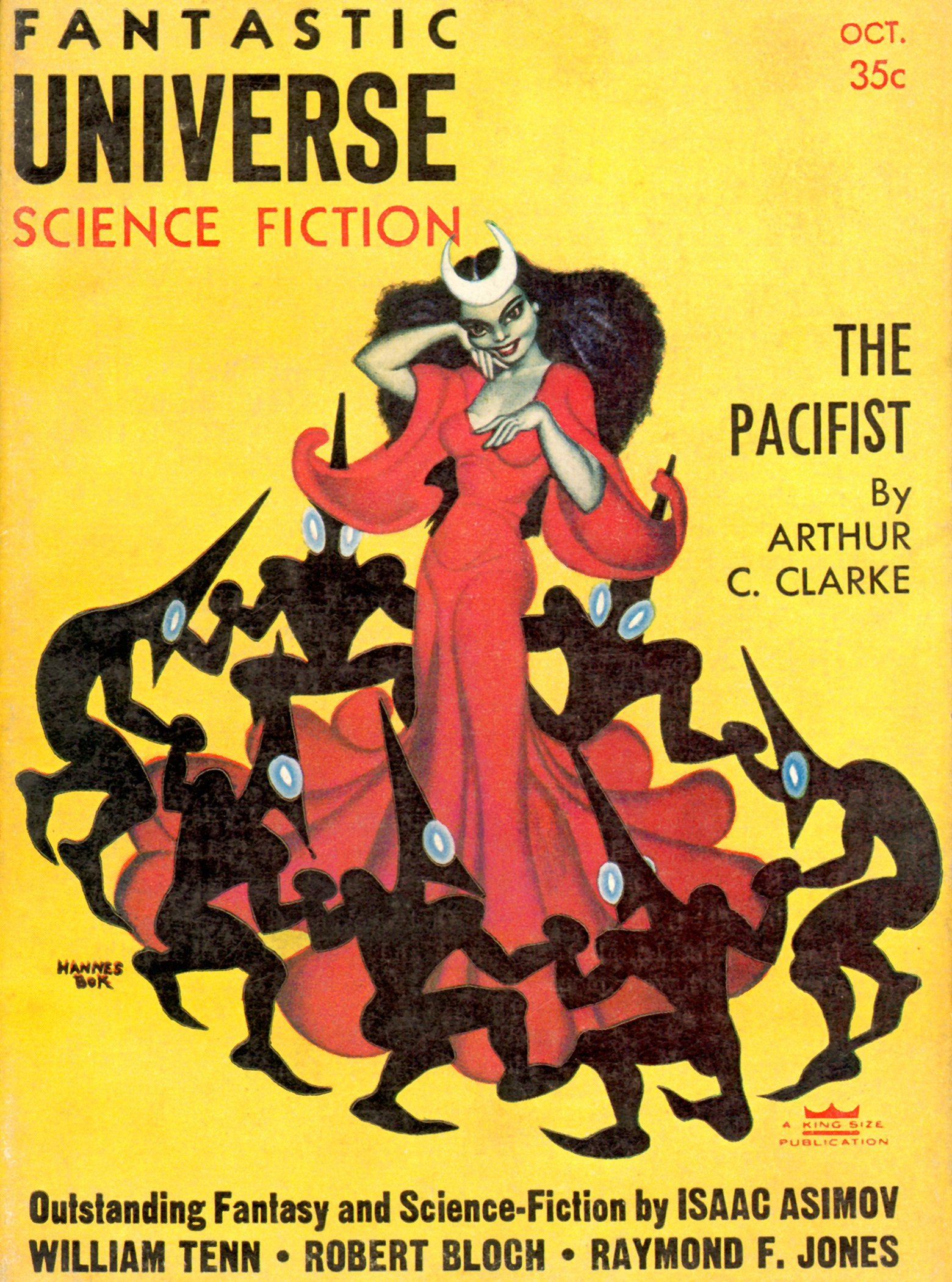
- Country: United States
- Language: English
- Genre: Science fiction

Publication
- Published in: Fantastic Universe
- Publication type: Periodical
- Publisher: King-Size Publications
- Media type: Print (Magazine, Hardback & Paperback)
- Publication date: October 1956

Chronology
- Series: Robot series
| Robot AL-76 Goes Astray | Runaround |

"First Law" is a science fiction short story by American writer Isaac Asimov, first published in the October 1956 issue of Fantastic Universe magazine and later collected in The Rest of the Robots (1964) and The Complete Robot (1982). The title of the story is a reference to the first of the Three Laws of Robotics.

== Background ==
In 1941 John W. Campbell of Astounding Science Fiction began a new department, "Probability Zero", for very short stories. He hoped to publish new writers, but wanted experienced authors early on, including Isaac Asimov. To Asimov's surprise, Campbell rejected "Big Game" and "First Law" in November and December 1941. Having learned that a rejected story might sell elsewhere, he saved "First Law" until it was published by Fantastic Universe in October 1956.

== Plot summary ==
The story is very short, only three pages in length, and takes the form of Mike Donovan's account of an incident that occurred on Titan, one of Saturn's moons. He tells of a malfunctioning robot named Emma that escaped from the base and was later encountered by Donovan while he was lost during a storm. While Donovan's life was in danger, Emma chose to protect its offspring, a small robot that it had built, instead of assisting him. This was a direct violation of the First Law of Robotics, which states that "a robot may not injure a human being, or through inaction allow a human being to come to harm". Apparently, maternal instincts in the robot took precedence over its programming.

While such direct disobedience of the First Law is not described in any other robot story by Asimov, he points out that the story is told by Donovan, who may be an unreliable narrator. Asimov admits that "I was being funny at the expense of my robots". In The Complete Robot, he also points out that this story is intended as a parody and is not to be taken seriously.

| Preceded by: "Robot AL-76 Goes Astray" | Included in: The Rest of the Robots; The Complete Robot | Series: Robot series Foundation Series | Followed by: "Runaround" |
