= Robopsychology =

Study of personalities and behavior of intelligent machines

Robopsychology is the study of the personalities and behavior of intelligent machines. The term was coined by Isaac Asimov in the short stories collected in I, Robot, which featured robopsychologist Dr. Susan Calvin, and whose plots largely revolved around the protagonist solving problems connected with intelligent robot behaviour. The term has been also used in some academic studies from the field of psychology and human–computer interactions, and it refers to the study of the psychological consequences of living in societies where the application of robotics is becoming increasingly common.

== In real life ==
Andrea Kuszewski, a self-described robopsychologist gives the following examples of potential responsibilities for a robopsychologist in Discover.

- "Assisting in the design of cognitive architectures
- Developing appropriate lesson plans for teaching AI targeted skills
- Create guides to help the AI through the learning process
- Address any maladaptive machine behaviors
- Research the nature of ethics and how it can be taught and/or reinforced
- Create new and innovative therapy approaches for the domain of computer-based intelligences"

There is a robopsychology research division at Ars Electronica Futurelab.

The term "robopsychology" has been proposed to indicate a "sub-discipline in psychology to systematically study the psychological corollaries of living in societies where the application of robotic and artificial intelligence (AI) technologies is becoming increasingly common." According to proponents of robopsychology, such a discipline does not currently exist: a systematic review of scientific literature shows that in 2022 there was no psychological sub-discipline dedicated to the study of the effects robots have on people's lives.

A.V. Libin and E.V. Libin define the term as follows: "[it is] a systematic study of compatibility between people and artificial creatures on many different levels [...]. Robotic psychology studies individual differences in people's interactions with various robots, as well as the diversity of the robots themselves, applying principles of differential psychology to the traditional fields of human factors and human–computer interaction. Moreover, robopsychologists study psychological mechanisms of the animation of the technological entity which result in a unique phenomenon defined as a robot's "personality.""

== In fiction ==
As described by Asimov, robopsychology appears to be a mixture of detailed mathematical analysis and traditional psychology, applied to robots. Human psychology is also a part, covering human interaction with robots. This includes the "Frankenstein complex" – the irrational fear that robots (or other creations) will turn on their creator.

== See also ==
- Cybernetics
- Human-robot interaction
- Psychohistory
- Three Laws of Robotics
