= I, Robot =

Collection of short stories by Isaac Asimov

- First edition cover
- Author: Isaac Asimov
- Cover artist: Edd Cartier
- Language: English
- Series: Robot series
- Genre: Science fiction
- Publisher: Gnome Press
- Publication date: December 2, 1950
- Publication place: United States
- Media type: Print (hardback)
- Pages: 253
- Followed by: The Rest of the Robots; The Complete Robot

I, Robot is a collection of science fiction short stories by American writer Isaac Asimov. The stories originally appeared in the American magazines Super Science Stories and Astounding Science Fiction between 1940 and 1950. In 1950, the stories were compiled into a single publication by Gnome Press, in an initial printing of 5,000 copies.

In 1982, all the short stories, minus the frame story, were included in The Complete Robot.

== Overview ==
The stories are woven together by a framing narrative in which the fictional Dr. Susan Calvin tells each story to a reporter, who serves as the narrator, in the 21st century. Although the stories can be read separately, they share a theme of the interaction of humans, robots, and morality, and when combined they tell a larger story of Asimov's fictional history of robotics.

Several of the stories feature the character of Dr. Calvin, chief robopsychologist at U.S. Robots and Mechanical Men, Inc., the major manufacturer of robots. Upon their publication in this collection, Asimov wrote a framing sequence presenting the stories as Calvin's reminiscences during an interview with her about her life's work, chiefly concerned with aberrant behaviour of robots and the use of "robopsychology" to sort out what is happening in their positronic brain.

The book also contains the short story in which Asimov's Three Laws of Robotics first appear, which had large influence on later science fiction and had impact on thought on ethics of artificial intelligence as well. Other characters that appear in these short stories are Powell and Donovan, a field-testing team that identifies flaws in USRMM's prototype models.

The collection shares a title with the then-recent short story "I, Robot" (1939) by Eando Binder, pseudonym of Earl and Otto Binder, which greatly influenced Asimov. Asimov had wanted to call his collection Mind and Iron, and objected when the publisher made the title the same as Binder's. In his introduction to the story in Isaac Asimov Presents the Great SF Stories (1979), Asimov wrote:

It certainly caught my attention. Two months after I read it, I began "Robbie", about a sympathetic robot, and that was the start of my positronic robot series. Eleven years later, when nine of my robot stories were collected into a book, the publisher named the collection I, Robot over my objections. My book is now the more famous, but Otto's story was there first.

— Isaac Asimov (1979)

== Contents ==
- "Robbie" (1940, revised 1950)
- "Runaround" (1942), (novelette)
- "Reason" (1941)
- "Catch That Rabbit" (1944)
- "Liar!" (1941)
- "Little Lost Robot" (1947) (novelette)
- "Escape!" (1945)
- "Evidence" (1946) (novelette)
- "The Evitable Conflict" (1950) (novelette)

== Reception ==
In 1951, The New York Times described I, Robot as "an exciting science thriller [which] could be fun for those whose nerves are not already made raw by the potentialities of the atomic age".

Describing it as "continuously fascinating", Groff Conklin "unreservedly recommended" the book.

P. Schuyler Miller recommended the collection: "For puzzle situations, for humor, for warm character, [and] for most of the values of plain good writing."

== Awards ==
| Year | Award | Category | Recipient | Result | Ref. |
|---|---|---|---|---|---|
| 1995 | 1995 Locus Awards | Best Art Book | I, Robot: the Illustrated Screenplay by Harlan Ellison and Isaac Asimov | 3 | |
| 2012 | 2012 Locus Poll | Best 20th Century Short Story | "Robbie" | 29 | |
| 2012 | 2012 Locus Poll | Best 20th Century Short Story | "Liar!" | 41 | |
| 2016 | 1941 Retro-Hugo Awards | Best Short Story | "Robbie" | Won | |
| 2018 | 1943 Retro-Hugo Awards | Best Short Story | "Runaround" | Nominated | |

== Adaptations ==
=== Television ===
At least three of the short stories from I, Robot have been adapted for television. The first was a 1962 episode of Out of this World hosted by Boris Karloff called "Little Lost Robot" with Maxine Audley as Susan Calvin. Two short stories from the collection were made into episodes of the British series Out of the Unknown. These are "The Prophet" (1967), based on "Reason"; and "Liar!" (1969). Both episodes were wiped by the BBC and are no longer thought to exist, although video clips, audio extracts and still photographs have survived. Repurposed robot costumes from The Prophet appeared in the 1968 Doctor Who serial The Mind Robber.

In 1987, the 12th episode of the USSR science fiction television series This Fantastic World, titled Don't Joke with Robots, was based on works by Alexander Belyaev and Fredrik Kilander and Asimov's "Liar!" story.

Both the original and revival series of The Outer Limits include episodes named "I, Robot". These are adaptations of an unrelated work by Earl and Otto Binder under their joint pseudonym "Eando Binder". The Binders' story introduced a recurring character, the robot named Adam Link.

In August 2023, David S. Goyer revealed that he had obtained permission from FOX head Lachlan Murdoch, a self-professed fan of Apple TV+'s Foundation, to adapt concepts from I, Robot to the series' 2023 second season, in "tying [Demerzel/Daneel] into the I, Robot laws [and] doing a spin-off mini-series that specifically delves into our version of "The Robot Wars".

=== Films ===
==== Harlan Ellison's screenplay (1977–1978) ====
In the late 1970s, Warner Bros. acquired the option to make a film based on the book, but no screenplay was ever accepted. The most notable attempt was one by Harlan Ellison, who collaborated with Asimov to create a version that captured the spirit of the original. Asimov is quoted as saying that this screenplay would lead to "the first really adult, complex, worthwhile science fiction movie ever made." Ellison worked on the project from December 1977 to December 1978. Asimov advised Ellison as to the scientific validity of some elements of the script.

Ellison's script, taking inspiration from Citizen Kane, began with reporter Robert Bratenahl tracking down information about Susan Calvin's alleged former lover Stephen Byerly. This provided for a framing sequence to adaptations of Asimov's stories. These differ from the originals in that they more strongly center around Calvin as a character. Ellison placed Calvin into stories in which she had not appeared and amplified her role in ones in which she did.

Although well-regarded by critics, the screenplay is generally considered to have been unfilmable for practical reasons, given the technology and average film budgets of the time. Asimov also believed that the film may have been scrapped owing to a conflict between Ellison and the producers: when the producers suggested changes in the script, instead of being diplomatic as advised by Asimov, Ellison "reacted violently" and offended them.

In late 1987, the script was serialized in Asimov's Science Fiction magazine. In 1994, it appeared in book form with illustrations by Mark Zug under the title I, Robot: The Illustrated Screenplay, reprinted 2004, ISBN 1-4165-0600-4. Both Ellison and Asimov received credits.

==== 2004 film ====
The film I, Robot, starring Will Smith, was released by Twentieth Century Fox in July 2004 in the United States. Its plot uses elements of "Little Lost Robot", a few of Asimov's character names and the Three Laws. The plot of the movie is original; the screenplay Hardwired by Jeff Vintar is not based on Asimov's stories. It has been compared to Asimov's The Caves of Steel, which revolves around the murder of a roboticist. Unlike the works by Asimov, the movie featured hordes of killer robots.

=== Radio ===
BBC Radio 4 aired an audio drama adaptation of five of the I, Robot stories on their 15 Minute Drama in 2017, dramatized by Richard Kurti and starring Hermione Norris.

1. Robbie
2. Reason
3. Little Lost Robot
4. Liar
5. The Evitable Conflict

These also aired in a single program on BBC Radio 4 Extra as Isaac Asimov's 'I, Robot': Omnibus.

== Prequels ==
The Asimov estate asked Mickey Zucker Reichert, best known for the Norse fantasy Renshai series, to write three prequels for I, Robot, since she was a science fiction writer with a medical degree who first met Asimov when she was 23, although she did not know him well. She was the first female writer to be authorized to write stories based on Asimov's novels.

The follow-ups to Asimov's Foundation series had been written by Gregory Benford, Greg Bear, and David Brin.

Berkley Books ordered the I, Robot prequels, which included:

- I, Robot: To Protect (2011)
- I, Robot: To Obey (2013)
- I, Robot: To Preserve (2016)

== Legacy ==
In 2004, The Saturday Evening Post said that I, Robot's Three Laws "revolutionized the science fiction genre and made robots far more interesting than they ever had been before." I, Robot has influenced many aspects of modern popular culture, particularly with respect to science fiction and technology. One example of this is in the technology industry. The name of the real-life modem manufacturer named USRobotics was directly inspired by I, Robot. The name is taken from the name of a robot manufacturer ("United States Robots and Mechanical Men") that appears throughout Asimov's robot short stories. Many works in the field of science fiction have also paid homage to Asimov's collection, such as Star Trek, Doctor Who, Aliens, Futurama, and Enthiran.The positronic brain, which Asimov named his robots' central processors, has been utilized in works such as Star Trek: The Next Generation, Doctor Who, Once Upon a Time... Space, Perry Rhodan, and The Number of the Beast.

Author Cory Doctorow wrote a story called "I, Robot" as homage to and critique of Asimov, as well as "I, Row-Boat", both released in the 2007 short story collection Overclocked: Stories of the Future Present. He has also said, "If I return to this theme, it will be with a story about uplifted cheese sandwiches, called 'I, Rarebit.'"

Other media have drawn upon I, Robot, such as I Robot (1977) by The Alan Parsons Project, I, Human (2009) by Singaporean band Deus Ex Machina, and The Simpsons ("I D'oh Bot")

== See also ==
- I, Robot (film)

== General and cited references ==
- Chalker, Jack L.; Mark Owings (1998). The Science-Fantasy Publishers: A Bibliographic History, 1923–1998. Westminster, MD and Baltimore: Mirage Press, Ltd. p. 299.

| Preceded by None | Robot series Foundation Series | Succeeded by The Complete Robot |
