= Robot City (video game) =

1995 video game

- Boxart
- Developer: Brooklyn Multimedia
- Publisher: Byron Preiss Multimedia
- Producer: Byron Preiss
- Platforms: Windows, Mac OS
- Release: December 31, 1995
- Genre: Graphic adventure
- Mode: Single-player

Robot City is a graphic adventure game developed by Brooklyn Multimedia and published by Byron Preiss Multimedia. It was released on December 31, 1995 for Macintosh and Windows 95. It is a point-and-click mystery game in which the player controls Derec, the main character in the Isaac Asimov's Robot City novel series.

== Gameplay ==
In the vein of Myst and other graphic adventure games from the time, Robot City features a first-person perspective. The player must click to move around Robot City and interact with the 3-D environment. Unlike Myst, however, character interaction is an integral part of the game. A conversation system allows the reader to pick between a number of topics to talk about, and the player's choices can have significant in-game consequences. The game has multiple endings which also depend on the player's actions. The puzzles in the game are fairly straightforward, such as connecting the right wires and data chips to rebuild a robot. The real puzzles lie in choosing the right things to say in order to persuade other characters. This is where Asimov's Three Laws of Robotics really come into play. For example, a robot might block access to a certain area because it has been ordered to do so (it is following the second law). However, if you tell the robot that the real murderer is chasing you then the robot will let you enter; failure to do so would constitute allowing harm to come to a human through inaction, and the first law takes priority over the second in the game.

== Story ==
The story of the game closely follows Isaac Asimov's Robot City, a series of novels inspired by Isaac Asimov's Three Laws of Robotics.

== Reception ==
Entertainment Weekly gave the game a B−
