= Let's Get Together (short story) =

- Short story by Isaac Asimov
- Country: United States
- Language: English
- Genre: Science fiction

Publication
- Published in: Infinity Science Fiction
- Publication type: Periodical
- Publisher: Royal Publications
- Media type: Print (Magazine)
- Publication date: February 1957

"Let's Get Together" is a science fiction short story by American writer Isaac Asimov. It was originally published in the February 1957 issue of Infinity Science Fiction, and included in the collections The Rest of the Robots (1964) and The Complete Robot (1982). The story involves Russian androids that infiltrate America with plans to trigger a nuclear-level explosion. The robots in this tale are very different from Asimov's norm, being quite willing to work as war machines. The tale is also based on a continuation of Cold War hostility, rather than the peaceful unified world of most of the robot stories.

== Plot summary ==
The Cold War has endured for a century and an uneasy peace, between "Us" and "Them", exists. A secret agent arrives in America from Moscow with the story that robots, identical to humans in appearance and behaviour, have been developed by "them" and that ten have already infiltrated America. When they get together, they will trigger a nuclear-level explosion (they are components of a total conversion bomb).

A conference of "our" greatest minds in all the branches of natural science is hastily convened to decide how to detect these robots and how to catch up on this technology. Almost too late, the head of the Bureau of Robotics realises that "their" plan exactly anticipates this response: the infiltrator robots have replaced scientists invited to this conference and, while the explosion would kill a relatively small number of people, it would precisely include "our" top scientists and, therefore, all the scientists arriving to the conference must pass a security check before they are allowed to come together.

His guess is proven correct almost immediately, as ten of the scientists en route explode via self-destruct charges. However, the bureau chief wonders how "they" could have realized and acted upon the discovery of the plan so quickly. The truth dawns on him; he pulls a blaster and blows the secret agent's head off. The body slumps forward leaking "not blood, but high-grade machine oil."
