= Runaround (story) =

Science fiction short story by American writer Isaac Asimov

- Short story by Isaac Asimov
- Illustrator: Paul Orban
- Country: United States
- Language: English
- Genre: Science fiction

Publication
- Published in: Astounding Science Fiction
- Publication type: Periodical
- Publisher: Street & Smith
- Media type: Print (magazine, hardback, paperback)
- Publication date: March 1942

Chronology
- Series: Robot series
First Law	Reason

"Runaround" is a science fiction short story by American writer Isaac Asimov, featuring his recurring characters Powell and Donovan. It was written in October 1941 and first published in the March 1942 issue of Astounding Science Fiction. It appears in the collections I, Robot (1950), The Complete Robot (1982), and Robot Visions (1990). In 2018, "Runaround" was nominated for a retrospective 1943 Hugo Award for best short story. The story features the first explicit appearance of the Three Laws of Robotics.

== Plot dilemma ==
As in many of Asimov's Robot stories, conflicts in the application of the Three Laws of Robotics is the subject of the plot. In contrast to the majority of such stories, in which the lexical ambiguities of the Laws are employed to fashion a dilemma, the robot featured in "Runaround" is actually following the Laws as they were intended.

The plot revolves around the Three Laws of Robotics:

1. A robot may not injure a human being or, through inaction, allow a human being to come to harm.
2. A robot must obey the orders given it by human beings except where such orders would conflict with the First Law.
3. A robot must protect its own existence as long as such protection does not conflict with the First or Second Laws. (Note: This is an exact transcription of the laws. They also appear in the front of the book, and in both places there is no "to" in the Second Law.)

The robot finds it impossible to obey both the Second Law and the Third Law at the same time, and this freezes it in a loop of repetitive behavior.

== Plot summary ==
In 2015, Powell, Donovan and Robot SPD-13, also known as "Speedy", are sent to Mercury to restart operations at a mining station which was abandoned ten years before.

They discover that their life support system is short on selenium and will soon fail. Donovan sends Speedy to a nearby selenium pool, but he does not return as expected. After scouting with a more primitive robot, they discover that Speedy is running in a huge circle around the selenium pool. When Speedy is asked to return with the selenium, he begins talking oddly, quoting Gilbert and Sullivan and showing symptoms that, if he were human, would be interpreted as drunkenness.

Powell eventually realizes that the selenium source contains unforeseen danger to the robot. Under normal circumstances, Speedy would observe the Second Law, but because Speedy was so expensive to manufacture, the Third Law had been strengthened. As the order to retrieve the selenium was casually worded with no particular emphasis, Speedy cannot decide whether to obey it, following the Second Law, or protect himself from danger, following the strengthened Third Law. The conflicting Laws cause what is basically a feedback loop which confuses him to oscillate around the point where the two compulsions are of equal strength, which makes Speedy appear inebriated.

Under the Second Law Speedy should obey Powell's order to return to base, but that fails, as the conflicted positronic brain cannot accept new orders. An attempt to increase the compulsion of the Third Law also fails. They place oxalic acid, which can destroy Speedy, in his path, but it merely causes Speedy to change his route until he finds a new equilibrium between the avoid-danger law and the follow-order law.

The only thing that trumps both the Second Law and Third Law is the First Law of Robotics which states that "a robot may not... allow a human being to come to harm". Therefore, Powell decides to risk his life by going out in the heat, hoping that the First Law will force Speedy to overcome his cognitive dissonance to save Powell's life. The plan works, and the team is able to repair the photocell banks.

== Influences ==
Artificial intelligence researcher Marvin Minsky said: "After 'Runaround' appeared in the March 1942 issue of Astounding [now Analog Science Fiction and Fact], I never stopped thinking about how minds might work."

== Notes ==
Preceded by: "First Law"	Included in: The Complete Robot; I, Robot	Series: Robot series Foundation series	Followed by: "Reason"
