= Isaac Asimov's Utopia =

1996 novel by Roger MacBride Allen

- First US edition
- Author: Roger MacBride Allen
- Cover artist: Bruce Jensen
- Language: English
- Series: Robot series
- Genre: Science fiction
- Publisher: Millennium (UK)
- Publication date: 1996
- Publication place: United States
- Media type: print (Hardback/Paperback)
- Preceded by: Isaac Asimov's Inferno

Isaac Asimov's Utopia (1996) is a science fiction novel by American writer Roger MacBride Allen, set in Isaac Asimov's Foundation universe.

== Plot summary ==
Utopia takes place five years into the reign of Alvar Kresh as the governor of Inferno, who is now married to roboticist Fredda Leving. The re-terraforming effort is doing fairly well, but many believe it is still doomed to failure. The plot centers around a plan created by an Infernal named Davlo Lentrall to use a comet, named comet Grieg after the old governor, to dig a channel creating a northern sea.

Norlan Fiyle, who has been working as an intelligence broker, found out about this plan early and informed the Settlers, the Ironheads, and the New Law robots of the plan. The issue is complicated by the fact that the plan calls for the comet to land essentially on top of the new law robot city of Valhalla.

Tonya Welton, the leader of the settlers on Inferno, is upset by this plan having seen similar plans fail in the past. She orders her security people to grab Davlo and destroy his work. Although they were successful in destroying his data, the attempt to capture Davlo himself failed due to quick thinking on the part of Commander Justen Devray, now the head of the Combined Inferno Police, and the help of Davlo's robot Kaelor.

Unfortunately, the location of comet Grieg is lost. Davlo and Fredda Leving attempt to extract this information from Kaelor's memory, but he ends up killing himself rather than release the information which might cause harm to humans. Davlo's guilt over the death of his robot eventually leads him to oppose the comet plan altogether. Eventually the information is retrieved when Jadelo Gildern, who had previously stolen the data from Davlo's office, provides Governor Kresh with the missing data.

While trying to decide whether to implement the comet plan, Kresh pays a visit to the terraforming control system. The system consists of a robotic unit, called Unit Dee, working with a non-sentient Settler unit, Unit Dum, they are collectively referred to as the Twins. We learn that in order to avoid First Law conflicts, Unit Dee is being lied to and told that the entire terraforming project is really an elaborate simulation and that no actual human beings are involved. Significant care must be taken to ensure that Dee does not learn the truth. Dee confirms that Davlo's plan, if successful, stands a good chance of repairing Inferno's ecology. The comet project is given the go-ahead and work commences to evacuate the areas near the impact site.

As the impact approaches, Simcor Beddle and Jadelo Gildern develop a plan to use a burrowing bomb, normally used for geological surveys, to destroy Valhalla before the new law robots have time to finish evacuating. On the way there though, Simcor's aircar is attacked, his robots killed, and a demand, to stop the comet and deliver money into a bank account or Beddle will die, is written on the door.

Kresh's robot Donald, who heard of this incident, is forced by the First Law to act. He contacts robots in the area, who begin performing a search, and tells Dee that she is being lied to about the simulation. This causes Dee to shut down, leaving the people on the ground with few options for the final steering of the comet.

Meanwhile, Devray tries to find Beddle. He tries putting money in the account mentioned in the demand and finds that it is automatically transferred to one of Gildern's accounts. Devray brings in Gildern, and also questions Fiyle, from whom he learns about Beddle's plan to destroy the New Law robots. Caliban turns himself in preemptively. The three talk while in jail, and Caliban manages to deduce what has happened to Beddle and rushes off to save him. While flying there, Caliban sends out a hyperwave message to tell the other robots that are searching to go back and that the situation is under control. Caliban goes to Valhalla, where he finds several New Law robots dead and Prospero holding Beddle prisoner, with a setup where if Beddle tries to leave, he will set off the bomb. Prospero was attempting to kill Beddle while avoiding the New First Law. Caliban is left with a choice of whom to let live, and kills Prospero, saving Beddle shortly before the comet hits.

In the meantime, Dee finally wakes up and asks to talk to Kresh. She verifies that she was in fact being lied to. She asks Kresh if he believes Caliban's message about saving Beddle. When Kresh says that he does believe it, Dee decides that she can manage the comet without First Law conflict.
