= Robot series =

Series of stories by Isaac Asimov

- The Robots of Dawn (1983)
- Author: Isaac Asimov
- Country: United States
- Language: English
- Genre: Science fiction
- Published: 1940–1995
- No. of books: 43

The Robot series is a series of 37 science fiction short stories and six novels created by American writer Isaac Asimov; the books were published between 1940 and 1995. The series is set in a world where sentient positronic robots serve a number of purposes in society. To ensure their loyalty, the Three Laws of Robotics are programmed into these robots, with the intent of preventing them from ever becoming a danger to humanity. Later, Asimov merged the Robot series with his Foundation series.

== Novels and stories ==
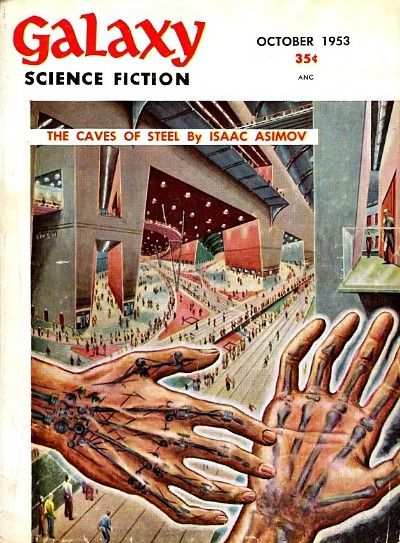
The first instalment of Asimov's The Caves of Steel took the cover of the October 1953 issue of Galaxy Science Fiction, illustrated by Ed Emshwiller

The series started with the story "Robbie" in the September 1940 Super Science Stories, appearing under the title "Strange Playfellow", which was not Asimov's title. Although it was originally written as a stand-alone story, the following year Asimov published a series of additional robot stories, which fit into a narrative that was then put together as the book I, Robot.

=== List of works in the Robot Series, in chronological order by narrative ===
1. The Complete Robot (1982) (which contains all short stories published in the earlier collections I, Robot (1950) and The Rest of the Robots (1964)), Robot Dreams (1986), Robot Visions (1990), and Gold (1995) – collections of short stories and essays
2. "The Bicentennial Man" (1976) and The Positronic Man (1992) – short story and related subsequent novel
3. "Mother Earth" (1949) – short story in which no individual robots appear, but positronic robots are part of the background
4. The Caves of Steel (1954) – first Robot series/R. Daneel Olivaw novel
5. The Naked Sun (1957) – second Robot series/R. Daneel Olivaw novel
6. "Mirror Image" (1972) – short story about R. Daneel Olivaw and detective Elijah Baley
7. The Robots of Dawn (1983) – third Robot series/R. Daneel Olivaw novel
8. Robots and Empire (1985) – fourth Robot series/R. Daneel Olivaw novel

=== Overview of short stories ===
Most of Asimov's robot short stories, which he began to write in 1939, are set in the first age of positronic robotics and space exploration. The unique feature of Asimov's robots is the Three Laws of Robotics, hardwired in a robot's positronic brain, with which all robots in his fiction must comply, and which ensure that the robot does not turn against its creators.

The stories were not initially conceived as a set, but all feature his positronic robots. They all share a theme of the interaction of humans, robots, and morality. Some of the short stories found in The Complete Robot (1982) and other anthologies appear not to be set in the same universe as the Foundation universe. "Victory Unintentional" has positronic robots obeying the Three Laws, but also a non-human civilization on Jupiter.

"Let's Get Together" features humanoid robots, but from a different future, where the Cold War is still in progress, and with no mention of the Three Laws. Some characters appear in more than one of the stories. The manufacturer of the robots is often identified as the (fictional) corporation U.S. Robots and Mechanical Men.

The Complete Robot contains most of Asimov's robot short stories. Missing ones were either written after its publication or formed the text connecting the stories in I, Robot.

The six Asimov robot short stories not included in this book are:

- "Robot Dreams" (found in the anthology of the same title)
- "Robot Visions" (found in the anthology of the same title)
- "Too Bad!" (found in Robot Visions)
- "Christmas Without Rodney" (found in Robot Visions)
- "Cal" (found in Gold)
- "Kid Brother" (found in Gold)

=== Overview of the Robot Novels ===
The first book is I, Robot (1950), a collection of nine previously published short stories woven together as a 21st-century interview with robopsychologist Dr. Susan Calvin. The next four robot novels The Caves of Steel (1953), The Naked Sun (1955), The Robots of Dawn (1983), and Robots and Empire (1985) make up the Elijah Baley (sometimes "Lije Baley") series, and are mysteries starring the Terran Elijah Baley and his humaniform robot partner, R. Daneel Olivaw. They are set thousands of years after the short stories and focus on the conflicts between Spacers — descendants of human settlers from other planets — and the people from an overcrowded Earth.

"Mirror Image", one of the short stories from The Complete Robot anthology, is also set in this time period, between The Naked Sun and The Robots of Dawn, and features both Baley and Olivaw. Another short story (found in The Early Asimov anthology), "Mother Earth", is set about a thousand years before the robot novels, when the Spacer worlds chose to become separated from Earth.

The Caves of Steel and The Naked Sun are both considered classics of the genre. The later novels were also well received, with The Robots of Dawn nominated for both the Hugo and Locus Awards in 1984 and Robots and Empire shortlisted for the Locus Award for Best Science Fiction Novel in 1986.

== Inspiration ==
One source of inspiration for Asimov's robots was the Zoromes, a race of mechanical men that featured in a 1931 short story called "The Jameson Satellite", by Neil R. Jones. Asimov read this story at the age of 11, and acknowledged it as a source of inspiration in Before the Golden Age (1975), an anthology of 1930's science fiction in which Asimov told the story of the science fiction he read during his formative years. In Asimov's own words:

It is from the Zoromes, beginning with their first appearance in "The Jameson Satellite," that I got my own feeling for benevolent robots who could serve man with decency, as these had served Professor Jameson. It was the Zoromes, then, who were the spiritual ancestors of my own "positronic robots," all of them, from Robbie to R. Daneel.

== Other authors of robot novels set in Asimov's universe ==
The 1989 anthology Foundation's Friends included the positronic robot stories "Balance" by Mike Resnick, "Blot" by Hal Clement, "PAPPI" by Sheila Finch, "Plato's Cave" by Poul Anderson, "The Fourth Law of Robotics" by Harry Harrison and "Carhunters of the Concrete Prairie" by Robert Sheckley. Not all of these stories are entirely consistent with the Asimov stories. The anthology also included "Strip-Runner" by Pamela Sargent, set in the era of the Elijah Baley novels.

Shortly before his death in 1992, Asimov approved an outline for three novels (Caliban, Inferno, Utopia) by Roger MacBride Allen, set between Robots and Empire and the Empire series, telling the story of the terraforming of the Spacer world Inferno, and about the robot revolution started by creating "No Law Robots" and then "New Law Robots."

There is also another set of novels by various authors, Isaac Asimov's Robot City, Robots and Aliens and Robots in Time series.

The Asimov estate authorized the publication of another trilogy of robot mysteries by Mark W. Tiedemann. These novels, which take place several years before Asimov's Robots and Empire, are Mirage (2000), Chimera (2001), and Aurora (2002). These were followed by yet another robot mystery, Alexander C. Irvine's Have Robot, Will Travel (2004), set five years after the Tiedemann trilogy.

In November 2009, the Asimov estate announced the upcoming publication of Robots and Chaos, the first volume in a trilogy featuring Susan Calvin by fantasy author Mickey Zucker Reichert. The book was published in November 2011 under the title I, Robot: To Protect, and was later followed by two sequels: I, Robot: To Obey (2013) and I, Robot: To Preserve (2016).

== Adaptations ==
- The first screen adaptation of an Asimov robot story was the third episode of the British television series Out of This World based on "Little Lost Robot", first broadcast in 1962. Dramatized by Leo Lehman and starring Maxine Audley as Susan Calvin, this is the only episode of the series known to have survived.
- This was followed by a 1964 dramatization of The Caves of Steel for the BBC series Story Parade and then four episodes of the BBC television series Out of the Unknown, based on "Satisfaction Guaranteed" (1966), "Reason (in an episode titled "The Prophet", 1967), "Liar!" (1969), and The Naked Sun (1969). In these adaptations, Elijah Baley was portrayed by Peter Cushing (The Caves of Steel) and Paul Maxwell (The Naked Sun), R. Daneel Olivaw by John Carson (The Caves of Steel) and David Collings (The Naked Sun), and Susan Calvin by Beatrix Lehmann ("The Prophet") and Wendy Gifford ("Liar!"). In "Satisfaction Guaranteed", the character of Susan Calvin was renamed Dr. Inge Jensen and portrayed by Ann Firbank.
- El robot embustero (1966), short film directed by Antonio Lara de Gavilán, based on short story "Liar!"
- Robots (1988), film directed by Doug Smith and Kim Takal, based on the Robot series
- Robot City (1995), an adventure game released for Windows and Mac OS.
- Bicentennial Man (1999), film directed by Chris Columbus, based on novelette "The Bicentennial Man" and on novel The Positronic Man
- I, Robot (2004), film directed by Alex Proyas, based on ideas of short stories of the Robot series
- The Apple TV adaptation of the Foundation books contains several references to its shared universe with the Robots series. The robot character of Eto Demerzel is an adaptation of the character R. Daneel whose shrouded long-lived history is frequently mentioned. During the course of the show, several characters reference the "Robot Wars" that happened in the past and are apparently part of the Empire's history. According to show runner David S. Goyer, the references to aspects such as the "Robot Wars" are planned to be explored in future seasons of the show.

In the late 1970s, Harlan Ellison wrote a screenplay based on Asimov's book I, Robot for Warner Bros. This film project was ultimately abandoned, but Ellison's script was later published in book form as I, Robot: The Illustrated Screenplay (1994).

== Awards ==
Year	Award	Category	Recipient	Result	Ref.
1975	1975 Locus Awards	Best Novelette	"—That Thou Art Mindful of Him!"	3	
1975	1975 Hugo Awards	Best Novelette	"—That Thou Art Mindful of Him!"	Nominated	
1975	1975 Locus Poll	Best All-Time Novel	The Caves of Steel	30	
1976	1976 Locus Awards	Best Single Author Collection	Buy Jupiter and Other Stories (Note: The collection includes the short story "Light Verse".)	13	
1977	1976 Nebula Awards	Best Novelette	"The Bicentennial Man"	Won	
1977	1977 Hugo Awards	Best Novelette	"The Bicentennial Man"	Won	
1977	1977 Locus Awards	Best Novelette	"The Bicentennial Man"	Won	
1977	1977 Locus Awards	Best Author Collection	The Bicentennial Man and Other Stories	5	
1983	1983 Locus Awards	Best Single Author Collection	The Complete Robot	7	
1984	1984 Hugo Awards	Best Novel	The Robots of Dawn	Nominated	
1984	1984 Locus Awards	Best Science Fiction Novel	The Robots of Dawn	2	
1986	1986 Locus Awards	Best Science Fiction Novel	Robots and Empire	4	
1987	1986 Nebula Awards	Best Short Story	"Robot Dreams"	Nominated	
1987	1987 Hugo Awards	Best Short Story	"Robot Dreams"	Nominated	
1987	1987 Locus Awards	Best Short Story	"Robot Dreams"	Won	
1987	1987 Locus Awards	Best Collecttion	Robot Dreams (Note: The nominated collection includes the separately nominated short story of the same title.)	8	
1987	1987 Locus Poll	Best All-Time SF Novel	The Caves of Steel	33	
1990	1990 Locus Awards	Best Collection	The Asimov Chronicles (Note: The collection includes several stories from the Robot series, including "Robbie".)	14	
1995	1995 Locus Awards	Best Art Book	I, Robot: the Illustrated Screenplay by Harlan Ellison and Isaac Asimov	3	
2004	1954 Retro-Hugo Awards	Best Novel	The Caves of Steel	Nominated	
2012	2012 Locus Poll	Best 20th Century Novelette	"The Bicentennial Man"	4	
2012	2012 Locus Poll	Best 20th Century Short Story	"Robbie"	29	
2012	2012 Locus Poll	Best 20th Century Short Story	"Liar!"	41	
2016	1941 Retro-Hugo Awards	Best Short Story	"Robbie"	Won	
2018	1943 Retro-Hugo Awards	Best Short Story	"Runaround"	Nominated	

== See also ==
- Isaac Asimov bibliography (categorical)

== Notes ==
Foundation universe
Preceded by None	Robot series 1940–1985	Succeeded by Galactic Empire series
