= Gold (Asimov book) =

1995 collection of stories and essays by Isaac Asimov

Gold: The Final Science Fiction Collection
- First edition (published by Harper Prism).
- Author: Isaac Asimov
- Language: English
- Publisher: Harper Prism
- Publication date: 1995
- ISBN: 0-06-105206-X (first edition, hardcover)
- Dewey Decimal: 813.54
- LC Class: PS3551.S5 G62

Gold: The Final Science Fiction Collection is a 1995 collection of stories and essays by American writer Isaac Asimov. The stories, which comprise the volume's first half, are short pieces which had remained uncollected at the time of the author's death. "Cal" describes a robot that wishes to write, and the title story "Gold" expresses both Asimov's admiration of King Lear and his thoughts on cinema adaptations of his own stories. The story "Gold" won a Hugo Award.

== Contents ==
=== Part One: The Final Stories ===
Short stories:

1. "Cal" (1990), novelette, Robot series
2. "Left to Right" (1987), Probability Zero series
3. "Frustration" (1991)
4. "Hallucination" (1985), novelette, Multivac series
5. "The Instability" (1989)
6. "Alexander the God" (1989)
7. "In the Canyon" (1990)
8. "Good-bye to Earth" (1989)
9. "Battle-Hymn" (1995)
10. "Feghoot and the Courts" (1986)
11. "Fault-Intolerant" (1990)
12. "Kid Brother" (1990), Robot series
13. "The Nations in Space" (1995)
14. "The Smile of the Chipper" (1988)
15. "Gold" (1991), novelette

=== Part Two: On Science Fiction ===
Essays:

1. "The Longest Voyage" (1983)
2. "Inventing the Universe" (1990)
3. "Flying Saucers and Science Fiction" (1982)
4. "Invasion" (1990)
5. "The Science Fiction Blowgun" (1978)
6. "The Robot Chronicles" (1990)
7. "Golden Age Ahead" (1979)
8. "The All-Human Galaxy" (1983)
9. "Psychohistory" (1988)
10. "Science Fiction Series" (1986)
11. "Survivors" (1987)
12. "Nowhere!" (1983)
13. "Outsiders, Insiders" (1986)
14. "Science Fiction Anthologies" (1981)
15. "The Influence of Science Fiction" (1981)
16. "Women and Science Fiction" (1983)
17. "Religion and Science Fiction" (1984)
18. "Time-Travel" (1984)

=== Part Three: On Writing Science Fiction ===
Essays:

1. "Plotting" (1989)
2. "Metaphor" (1989)
3. "Ideas" (1990)
4. "Serials" (1980)
5. "The Name of Our Field" (1978)
6. "Hints" (1979)
7. "Writing for Young People" (1986)
8. "Names" (1984)
9. "Originality" (1986)
10. "Book Reviews" (1981)
11. "What Writers Go Through" (1981)
12. "Revisions" (1982)
13. "Irony" (1984)
14. "Plagiarism" (1985)
15. "Symbolism" (1985)
16. "Prediction" (1989)
17. "Best-Seller" (1983)
18. "Pseudonyms" (1984)
19. "Dialog" (1985)

Preceded by Robot Visions	Robot series Foundation Series	Succeeded by None
