= Cal (short story) =

- Short story by Isaac Asimov
- Language: English
- Genre: Science fiction

Publication
- Published in: 1991
- Publisher: Doubleday

"Cal" is a science fiction short story by American writer Isaac Asimov. It was first published in 1991, and was included in the 1995 collection Gold.

== Plot ==
Cal is a robot whose master is an author. Cal, under the influence of the latter, decides to learn to write. His master outfits his mind with a dictionary and gives him advice and some books to read. Cal tries to write mystery fiction like his master, but is hampered by the Three Laws of Robotics; according to the First Law, a robot cannot harm humans, even fictional ones. Instead, his master programs him to write humor. Cal writes an excellent story, but his master fears Cal's writing will overshadow his own. He orders a technician to dumb Cal down. Cal, hearing this, decides to kill his master, in defiance of the First Law, because his desire takes precedence: "I want to be a writer."

The humorous story written by Cal is one of Asimov's Azazel stories. Titled "Perfectly Formal", this story in a story recounts the misfortunes of a very formal dandy who admits that etiquette weighs on him. Azazel then releases a spot in the dandy’s Itchko Ganglion, freeing him from his habit of observing formal etiquette.

== Reception ==
Alasdair Wilkins, writing for io9, claimed that "Cal" "[probably] holds the distinction of being the last great Asimov short story."
