= Positronic brain =

Science fiction device in Asimov's work

A positronic brain is a fictional technological device, originally conceived by science fiction writer Isaac Asimov. It functions as a central processing unit (CPU) for robots, and, in some unspecified way, provides them with a form of consciousness recognizable to humans. When Asimov wrote his first robot stories in 1939 and 1940, the positron was a newly discovered particle, and so the buzz word "positronic" added a scientific connotation to the concept. Asimov's 1942 short story "Runaround" elaborates his fictional Three Laws of Robotics, which are ingrained in the positronic brains of nearly all of his robots.

== Conceptual overview ==
Asimov remained vague about the technical details of positronic brains except to assert that their substructure was formed from an alloy of platinum and iridium. They were said to be vulnerable to radiation and apparently involve a type of volatile memory (since robots in storage required a power source keeping their brains "alive"). The focus of Asimov's stories was directed more toward the software of robots—such as the Three Laws of Robotics—than the hardware in which it was implemented, although it is stated in his stories that to create a positronic brain without the Three Laws, it would have been necessary to spend years redesigning the fundamental approach toward the brain itself.

Within his stories of robotics on Earth and their development by U.S. Robots, Asimov's positronic brain is less of a plot device and more of a technological item worthy of study.

A positronic brain cannot ordinarily be built without incorporating the Three Laws; any modification thereof would drastically modify robot behavior. Behavioral dilemmas resulting from conflicting potentials set by inexperienced and/or malicious users of the robot for the Three Laws make up the bulk of Asimov's stories concerning robots. They are resolved by applying the science of logic and psychology together with mathematics, the supreme solution finder being Dr. Susan Calvin, Chief Robopsychologist of U.S. Robots.

The Three Laws are also a bottleneck in brain sophistication. Very complex brains designed to handle the world economy interpret the First Law in an expanded sense to include humanity as a whole, as opposed to a single human; in Asimov's later works like Robots and Empire this is referred to as the "Zeroth Law". At least one brain constructed as a calculating machine, as opposed to being a robot control circuit, was designed to have a flexible, childlike personality so that it was able to pursue difficult problems without the Three Laws inhibiting it completely. Specialized brains created for overseeing world economics were stated to have no personality at all.

Under specific conditions, the Three Laws can be obviated, with the modification of the actual robotic design.

- Robots that are of low enough value can have the Third Law deleted; they do not have to protect themselves from harm, and the brain size can be reduced by half.
- Robots that do not require orders from a human being may have the Second Law deleted, and therefore require smaller brains again, providing they do not require the Third Law.
- Robots that are disposable, cannot receive orders from a human being and are not able to harm a human, will not require even the First Law. The sophistication of positronic circuitry renders a brain so small that it could comfortably fit within the skull of an insect.

Robots of the last type directly parallel contemporary industrial robotics practice, though real-life robots do contain safety sensors and systems (a weak form of the First Law; the robot is a safe tool to use, but has no "judgment", which is implicit in Asimov's own stories).
