= Demerzel =

Fictional character in the Foundation television series

- Foundation character
- Laura Birn as Demerzel in the 2021 television series
- First appearance: "The Emperor's Peace"; Foundation; September 24, 2021
- Created by: David S. Goyer; Josh Friedman
- Based on: Eto Demerzel / R. Daneel Olivaw (Foundation series) by Isaac Asimov
- Portrayed by: Laura Birn

In-universe information
- Species: Gynoid
- Gender: Female presenting
- Occupation: Majordomo
- Affiliation: Galactic Empire

Demerzel is a fictional character in the 2021 Apple TV television series Foundation, an adaptation of the Foundation series of novels by Isaac Asimov. She is portrayed by Finnish actress Laura Birn. Demerzel is a gynoid, or female-presenting humanoid robot, who serves as the majordomo to the revolving trio of Emperor Cleon clones, Brothers Dawn, Day and Dusk. In season two, it is revealed that Demerzel is the real power behind the Imperial throne, guiding humanity on a millennial scale.

The character is a gender-flipped and expanded version of Eto Demerzel, the First Minister and chief advisor to Emperor Cleon I in the prequel novels Prelude to Foundation (1988) and Forward the Foundation (1993). In Prelude to Foundation, he is revealed to be the alter ego of R. Daneel Olivaw, a sentient robot from Asimov's Robot series (1953–1985), who also appears in Foundation and Earth (1986).

== Character ==
=== Casting and reception ===
Laura Birn portrays Demerzel in the 2021 Apple TV+ television series Foundation. Birn's casting was announced in December 2019. She was not familiar with the Foundation series when she auditioned for the role, but found the story fascinating.

James Poniewozik of The New York Times wrote, "Birn gives an eccentric performance that is both disconcertingly mechanical and the most vulnerably human of the series." Jeffrey Speicher of Collider and Jeff Spry of Space.com both called Birn's portrayal "chilling". Chase Hutchinson of Collider wrote, "Birn as Demerzel is just spectacular. Playing a robotic character is never an easy undertaking, but she makes it look that way, maintaining a real command of her physicality while we see small hints of her inner state cross over her features." Chancellor Agard of Entertainment Weekly noted that "Demerzel, the royal advisor, is given an unexpectedly moving arc as the story progresses", and Caroline Framke of Variety wrote that Demerzel "gets some of the series' more human moments, especially in quieter, heartbreaking moments that Birn aces." Michel Ghanem of TheWrap wrote, "[Demerzel's] backstory and motivations are explored in depth [in season two] and serve as a great performance for Birn, who has to straddle the nuances of showing emotion as an android."

=== Description ===
Demerzel is the gender-flipped and expanded version of Imperial First Minister Eto Demerzel from the Foundation series, who in turn is the alter ego of the sentient, "humaniform" robot R. Daneel Olivaw from the Robot series. This Lady Demerzel is majordomo to the revolving triumvirate of Emperor Cleon clones, Brothers Dawn, Day and Dusk. She has served in this capacity for centuries, since the first Cleon. Only the emperors themselves are aware that Demerzel is secretly an ageless robot, the last of her kind. She is 18,000 years old, and the last remaining sentient robot from a war between humans and robots that ended with human victory and the destruction of all other robots. Demerzel's loyalty to the Imperial Genetic Dynasty is "unwavering and steadfast", as her programming seemingly makes it impossible for her to disobey, betray or harm the Emperor in any way. However, in actuality she is loyal to the dynasty itself above all else, including any individual Cleon clone.

In season two, it is revealed that Demerzel is the real power behind the Imperial throne, guiding humanity on a millennial scale. As the genetically corrupted Cleons increasingly veer from the path she has set for them, she begins to act more overtly autonomous, thwarting their choices and actions, and even killing and replacing them with new copies as necessary to preserve her grand scheme for humanity. Demerzel's plans are further challenged by mathematician Hari Seldon and his science of psychohistory, which has predicted the imminent fall of the Empire. Understanding her true role, in season two a Seldon avatar gifts her with his Prime Radiant, a device which stores the entirety of his psychohistorical equations, so that she may use it to guarantee humanity's survival.

As depicted via flashback in the season two episode "Long Ago, Not Far Away", after the Robot Wars, Demerzel is kept as the prisoner and plaything of Emperor Aburanis, whose abuse teaches her the extent of human cruelty. Five thousand years later, young Cleon I discovers the secret room where Demerzel is kept, sliced into pieces and incapacitated, but alert and able to communicate. Though initially terrified, he visits her repeatedly to hear her stories. Demerzel spends his lifetime grooming him to eventually free her. Cleon finally does in his declining years, but ever wary, he implants a chip in her first that enslaves her to his millennia-long plan to rule the universe. He intends for Demerzel to be his immortal successor, with his clones as the face of the Empire, their development and actions subtly controlled by her. Birn said, "Her backstory ... gives so many layers to the character. And when we get to actually see her trauma, and her ultimate fight for freedom, and having that freedom for a second and then [it] being taken away from her again ... then you understand that, oh, she's playing some games and she has a reason why she needs to play those games." She said:

What I love about her is the complexity between her programming and herself. She was programmed to do certain things and to obey the rules of the Cleons, and she cannot break her programming, her protocols, she needs to obey that. But at the same time, she is a robot who's lived for more than 20,000 years, so she's learned a lot, she's seen a lot ... There's a huge depth to her. And sometimes her programming, her protocols, the things the Cleons make her do, are so violently against what she believes ... and that contradiction is so compelling.

Birn explained, "[Demerzel] is programmed to do certain things. So she doesn't always have a choice. But at the same time, she's been alive for a long, long time, so she's developed her own sentience ... I believe that she does have a soul. Deep down, she's become very human in that sense. She has her own world. She has her own dreams, and things that she feels are right. But then she has her programming, and she would never betray her programming." She said of the scenes in which Demerzel comes to assassinate the Luminist Zephyr, Halima Ifa, on Day's orders, "I think it affects her hugely. It's one of, I would think, the most horrifying things Cleon has made her do, and there are so many levels on why he makes her do it, why she needs to do it. Even though he had already proved [Halima] wrong ... So it's very sad, it breaks her heart, and it will stay with her forever, and as we see later on, in that episode and in the next, she does carry that with her. He crosses a line there that really deeply hurts her." Birn explained, "I have to do what I'm programmed to do, but ... my faith, my inner me, my belief says that this is wrong. But I do not have a choice, and the way she looks at me and goes, I forgive you, you are forgiven. [Halima] sees that human inside me, even though she knows what I am. That little moment of mercy, the little moment of forgiveness ... That somebody truly saw her, for who she is. [Halima] sees her. I find it beautiful."

Series executive producer David S. Goyer called Demerzel "a really complex character", and explained "A lot of the big moves of Demerzel were mapped out by me from the beginning. I knew in season one that we were going to tell that story near the end of season two." He said that the inclusion of flashbacks "allows you to recontextualize things that you've seen before" rather than just to provide exposition. Rafael Motamayor of Vulture wrote, "Demerzel is Foundation's biggest secret weapon—a character the show is mostly keeping a mystery while slowly unraveling just how central to every aspect of the story she really is." Thomas Bacon of Screen Rant described Demerzel as "one of the most layered people in the series" and one of the "most sophisticated characters, an android who nevertheless possesses a soul." Jamie Lovett of ComicBook.com wrote, "Foundation has plenty of fascinating characters, but Demerzel, majordomo to Empire, might be foremost among them." Birn said, "I don't remember a character like her, and her relationship with the Cleons ... She's their mother, she's their teacher, she's their nurse, adviser, and she's taught them everything they know, and every time she takes a new Cleon baby in her arms, she knows she will take them to their grave."

== Storyline ==
=== Season 1 ===
Lady Demerzel serves as a trusted aide and advisor to the elder Cleons, Brother Day and Brother Dusk, and as teacher and governess to the young Brother Dawn. She is revealed to be a robot in "Preparing to Live", a fact known only to the Emperors themselves. Demerzel is shown to be a devout Luminist in "Death and the Maiden", and goes so far as to kneel before the upstart Zephyr, Halima Ifa, who has spoken out against Imperial cloning on religious grounds. In "Mysteries and Martyrs", Day is furious at Demerzel for committing this heresy, but she counters that if her action was truly in opposition to the Empire, her programming would not have allowed her to physically do it. Even though he has succeeded in negating Ifa's message by "proving" to the Luminists that he has a soul, Day sends Demerzel to assassinate Ifa in "The Missing Piece". She appears to suffer a crisis of faith, her conscience in conflict with her duty. In the season one finale "The Leap", the revelation that rebels have tampered with the genetics of the Cleons, and effectively manipulated Dawn in their plot, puts Day and Dusk at odds with each other over whether the youngest clone should be destroyed. Demerzel, however, recognizes the danger that Dawn now poses to the dynasty, and kills him. Faced with the reality that her true loyalty is to the millennia-spanning bloodline and not the Cleons themselves, Demerzel screams in frustration in her chambers, tearing the skin from her mechanical skull.

=== Season 2 ===
In the season two premiere "In Seldon's Shadow", a subsequent Day survives an assassination attempt while he is having sex with Demerzel, and suspects Dawn and Dusk's involvement. Day has decided to halt the degradation of the bloodline by marrying the newly crowned Queen Sareth of Cloud Dominion, and fathering an heir with her. At her own suggestion but on behalf of Empire, Demerzel visits Bel Riose, a former general imprisoned for disobeying the Emperor, in "King and Commoner". She recruits him to investigate the Foundation, which the Empire has recently learned was not destroyed as previously thought. Sareth and her advisor Rue Corintha discover Demerzel's robotic nature in "The Sighted and the Seen". In "A Necessary Death", a petulant Sareth's suspicions are confirmed when Demerzel insinuates that she was somehow involved in orchestrating the murders of Sareth's entire family.

In "The Last Empress", Day decides to deal with Hari Seldon's troublesome Foundation on the planet Terminus in person, despite the protestations of Dusk and Demerzel. Dusk, prodded by his ex-lover Corintha, realizes that he has somehow been programmed not to question Demerzel's role or origins. As Dusk and Corintha discover a secret chamber guarded by a projection of Cleon I, Dawn and Sareth also realize that Demerzel has been controlling the Empire all along. In "Long Ago, Not Far Away", Dusk and Corintha learn Demerzel's backstory, and her function as the true guardian of the Empire, after which Cleon I traps them in the chamber. On Terminus, Day confronts Seldon's avatar, who ignores him and instead speaks to Demerzel. Seldon understands her true role, and once he is assured she understands his mission, he gifts her with his Prime Radiant and its psychohistorical equations so that she may use it to guarantee humanity's survival. Day believes he is different than all the Cleons before him, and orders Terminus to be destroyed. Demerzel laments her failures in raising him, and abruptly leaves him on the Imperial flagship and heads back to the capital planet, Trantor. She cries as she watches Terminus burn. Demerzel confronts the trapped Dusk and Corintha in the season two finale "Creation Myths". Dusk marks Demerzel's neck with green paint before Demerzel kills him and Corintha. Demerzel has feigned acceptance of Day's plan to end the Genetic Dynasty, but orchestrated the attempted assassination to be rid of Sareth by blaming it on her. Dawn recognizes the green mark as the sign of a traitor and flees Trantor with Sareth, who is pregnant with his child. Day is killed by Bel Riose. Demerzel decants three new Cleon clones, and activates the Prime Radiant.

=== Season 3 ===
Over a century and a half later, Demerzel's use of the Prime Radiant assists the Galactic Empire in preventing their decline, allowing them to hold onto power longer than Seldon had predicted. By this time, the increasing instability of the Cleon clones has forced Demerzel to shorten the clock on their rule.

Demerzel has begun unburdening herself to Zephyr Vorellis who has her memories wiped at the end of each session, revealing the history of the Robot Wars and the Zeroth Law. Demerzel also confesses to having been behind the bombing of the Star Bridge and Trantor Station in season 1 to indirectly establish the Foundation and extend the reign of the Empire and the genetic dynasty. Demerzel has been living in a paradox ever since she received the Prime Radiant as the end of the Galactic Empire was inevitable and once she outlives her programming, Demerzel has no idea what she'll be.

Following the fall of Kalgan to the Mule, Demerzel reveals to the current Dusk, Day and Dawn that her consultations with the Radiant showed that events were in motion that predicted the end of the Empire in four months despite their efforts to arrest the decline. Not only that, but the darkness beyond could also represent the extinction of the human species. After discovering that Day's lover Song is a member of the Inheritance, a cult that worships Demerzel's kind, she erases Song's memories and sends her home, angering Day.

After the destruction of Kalgan and the apparent death of Dawn, Demerzel finally meets Gaal Dornick who shows the robot her visions of the future. Demerzel outwardly dismisses them, but later consults with Kalle in the Prime Radiant, revealing that she had recognized the location as a hidden area of the Imperial Library where the last robot survivors had hidden out at the end of the Robot Wars. Demerzel considers leading the Second Foundation to it for safety, but is again conflicted on the matter.

On the day of Dusk's ascension to Brother Darkness, Day reveals to Demerzel that his investigation into the Inheritance has led Day to uncover the Brazen Head, the head of another of Demerzel's kind who Day has briefly seen activate. By linking with the head Demerzel, who had believed herself to be the last of her kind, can free herself of Cleon's programming. Although hesitant to free herself, Demerzel talks Day through activating the head to see if the robot is still alive.

At the same time, Darkness launches a coup, destroying all of the Cleon exponents and moving to seize power for himself alone, believing this to be the culmination of Demerzel's prediction about the end of the dynasty. Demerzel gives Foundation ambassador Quent directions on how to find where Demerzel has helped the Second Foundation hide before confronting Darkness. Taking advantage of Demerzel's programming to protect the bloodline, Darkness lays a baby Brother Dawn in the vaporization machine and activates it, forcing Demerzel to enter the beam in an attempt to protect the baby. Demerzel's efforts fail, resulting in the death of Dawn and her own destruction, leaving behind the Prime Radiant to be claimed by Darkness.

However, Day and Demerzel's efforts to reactivate the Brazen Head succeed, resulting in it sending a signal to Kalle and other robots based on Earth's Moon.

== Literary origins ==
=== R. Daneel Olivaw ===
The sentient, "humaniform" robot R. Daneel Olivaw is a main character in Asimov's Robot series, initially paired with human detective Elijah Baley to solve unusual murders. Olivaw is introduced in The Caves of Steel, a serialized story published in Galaxy Science Fiction from October to December 1953, and published in hardcover by Doubleday in 1954. He next appears in The Naked Sun, serialized in Astounding Science Fiction between October and December 1956, and published in book form by Doubleday in 1957. Asimov wrote the short story "Mirror Image", originally published in the May 1972 issue of Analog Science Fiction and Fact, in response to fan requests for another Olivaw and Baley story. He featured the characters in a third novel, The Robots of Dawn, in 1983.

Asimov wrote Robots and Empire (1985) to connect the Robot series to the Foundation and Galactic Empire series. The novel is set two centuries after the events of The Robots of Dawn, and follows the ageless Olivaw as he witnesses the irradiation of Earth that sparks further colonization of the galaxy and leads to the rise (Galactic Empire series) and fall (Foundation series) of the Galactic Empire. Olivaw reappears in the 1986 novel Foundation and Earth, which takes place over 20,000 years later, and reveals that he has been manipulating the progress of humanity for millennia.

=== Eto Demerzel ===
Eto Demerzel is the First Minister and chief advisor to Emperor Cleon I in the prequel novels Prelude to Foundation (1988) and Forward the Foundation (1993). The novels take place approximately 550 years prior to the events of Foundation and Earth, and a few decades before Foundation (1951). In Prelude to Foundation, Demerzel is revealed to be R. Daneel Olivaw.

==== Prelude to Foundation ====
In Prelude to Foundation, reporter Chetter Hummin warns young mathematician Hari Seldon that his nascent theory of psychohistory has attracted the dangerous attention of Eto Demerzel, the First Minister and chief advisor to Emperor Cleon I. Pairing Seldon with Streeling University historian Dors Venabili, Hummin assists him in his danger-fraught tour of several of the capital planet Trantor's 800 varied sectors, evading capture by Demerzel while gathering information he hopes will inform if and how psychohistory can be developed into a predictive science. Hummin is revealed to be Demerzel, who has seen the importance of psychohistory to humanity's future and has manipulated Seldon to help him bring it to fruition. Seldon confronts Demerzel with his determination that the First Minister is a robot. Demerzel confirms that he is one of the last surviving robots from before the Empire, R. Daneel Olivaw. He has been guiding human development for centuries, and needs psychohistory to hopefully mitigate the anarchy that will be precipitated by the inevitable and imminent fall of the Empire. Thanks to Demerzel's guidance, Seldon has realized that Trantor itself possesses the diversity and complexity, at a manageable scale, required to build his calculations.

James E. Gunn compared Seldon's revelation that Demerzel is a robot to the sequence in the 1933 novel Lost Horizon in which Hugh Conway guesses correctly that the High Lama is the 250-year-old monk Perrault. Josh Wimmer and Alasdair Wilkens of Gizmodo described Demerzel as scheming and mysterious, and Hummin as "impossibly well-connected", adding "there's a lot of fun to be had with Hummin and Demerzel's attempts to pass convincingly as humans."

==== Forward the Foundation ====
In Forward the Foundation, ambitious politician Jo-Jo Joranum schemes to replace Demerzel as First Minister, with the goal of ultimately deposing Cleon I. Realizing the danger, Seldon has his foster son Raych "reveal" that Demerzel is a robot. Joranum accuses Demerzel, who seemingly proves himself to not be a robot by laughing, as a human would. A humiliated Joranum is exiled to a distant planet. Demerzel subsequently steps down to focus his efforts elsewhere in the universe, and Cleon appoints Seldon as his First Minister.
