= List of Robot series characters =

The following is a list of characters in Isaac Asimov's Robot series.

== Kelden Amadiro ==
Kelden Amadiro is a Spacer and the main antagonist in the novels The Robots of Dawn and Robots and Empire. He is the head of the Robotics Institute on Aurora. He is known for being extremely against the expansion of Earth to other planets, and in the end even tries to destroy the Earth by speeding up the rate of radiation in its crust. His memory of this is erased by R. Giskard Reventlov; however R. Giskard Reventlov allows Levular Mandamus to destroy the Earth because his motives were more beneficial for humanity and were therefore allowable by the Zeroth Law of Robotics (which was developed by R. Daneel Olivaw): since a slow increase in the rate of radiation would drive Earthpeople to the outer worlds, but a quick increase like Amadiro wanted, would kill the Earth with its population still on it.

== Bentley Baley ==
Bentley ("Ben") Baley is a fictional character in Robot series. He is Elijah Baley's son.

Baley is credited with starting the second wave of interstellar space exploration. He is responsible for the founding of Baleyworld (later became known as Comporellon), the first colonized world of the "Settlers".

== Daneel Giskard Baley ==
D. G. Baley is a seventh-generation descendant of Elijah Baley. Gladia Delmarre falls in love with him, and they travel to Solaria and Comporellon.

== Elijah Baley ==
Elijah ("Lije") Baley is a plainclothesman, a homicide detective on the New York City police force. In The Caves of Steel, he is called upon to help solve the murder of a Spacer. The Spacers assign him a robot partner, R. Daneel Olivaw, with whom he becomes lifelong friends, appearing together in two more books (and a short story). Though like all other Earthlings strongly agoraphobic, he starts a "club" on Earth for people to go outside, preparing the way for a second wave of Earth's expansion, led by his son Bentley Baley.

== Peter Bogert ==
Dr. Peter Bogert was second in command after Alfred Lanning, he is usually characterized as trying to seize position from Lanning. He is, however, a brilliant mathematician and is many times successful in the stories where he is featured, mainly those with Susan Calvin as main character. In "Liar!", he asks the robot if Lanning is about to retire, and the robot says yes, and that Bogert is the obvious successor. Bogert uses this to increase his power on the plant, but Lanning gets enraged by this sudden change in hierarchy and makes sure Bogert understands who is in charge.

Bogert later succeeds Lanning as director of research at U.S. Robots and Mechanical Men.

== Susan Calvin ==
Dr. Susan Calvin is a character in many short stories. She was the chief robopsychologist at U.S. Robots and Mechanical Men, Inc., the major manufacturer of robots in the 21st century. Typically, Asimov portrays Dr. Calvin as a highly driven woman, focused on her work and divorced from normal emotions, almost more "robotic" than her mechanical patients.

== Gladia Delmarre ==
Gladia Delmarre, later known as Gladia Solaria and Gladia Gremionis (while personally preferring to use no last name at all), is a character from Isaac Asimov's Robot series.

She first appears in the book The Naked Sun, which is set on Solaria, a planet with ten thousand robots for every human being, and where most people cannot tolerate the personal presence of other people. When Gladia's husband is murdered, she is the chief suspect because he would not have allowed anyone else near him. After Elijah Baley solves the murder case, proving that she is not responsible (though she was the one who delivered the actual blow, she appears unaware of that fact, and Baley doesn't share it with others), Gladia moves to Aurora.

In The Robots of Dawn, Elijah and Gladia meet again, this time on Aurora. They become lovers, and Gladia still has vivid memories of him 160 years after his death (as a Spacer, she has a lifespan of several centuries). In Robots and Empire she meets and falls in love with a seventh-generation descendant of Elijah Baley, named Daneel Giskard Baley, travels with him to Solaria and Baleyworld, and then decides to go to Earth and work for peace between Spacers and Settlers.

In Foundation and Earth, one character tells a story to another concerning a Spacer woman who fell in love with a Settler captain, a reference to Gladia.

== Han Fastolfe ==
Dr. Han Fastolfe is a fictional character in Isaac Asimov's Robot series. A Spacer scientist from the planet Aurora, he specializes in creating robots that mimic the outward appearance of human beings—androids, although Asimov calls them "humaniform robots". His most significant creations are R. Daneel Olivaw and R. Jander Panell. R. Giskard Reventlov is another of his creations, though he is not a humaniform robot, having a metal exterior. Fastolfe is Elijah Baley's chief Spacer ally; together, he and Baley are key figures in the human race's expansion into the Galaxy.

== Vasilia Fastolfe ==
Vasilia Fastolfe (also known as Vasilia Aliena) is a character from Isaac Asimov's Robot series. She is short and looks similar to Gladia Solaria.

The daughter of the roboticist Han Fastolfe, who while manipulating R. Giskard Reventlov, the robot assigned to her by her father, unwittingly gave it telepathic powers.

Later in life she was part of the robotics institute of Aurora and was in line to become the director. Her determination to not be on the planet during her father's death got her traveling to other Spacer worlds, including Solaria, where she came across specific mind patterns and associated them with telepathy, thereby discovering R. Giskard's powers. She tries to use the laws of robotics to get possession of Giskard in the duel scene from Robots and Empire. But with the help of R. Daneel Olivaw and their explanation of the Three Laws of Robotics, Giskard modifies her mind and she remembers nothing.

== Alfred Lanning ==
Dr. Alfred J. Lanning (1971–2035) is a character from the short stories and movie of I, Robot. In the movie he is played by James Cromwell. Lanning is the director of research at U.S. Robotics. His assistant and assumed successor is Peter Bogert.

== Clinton Madarian ==
Clinton Madarian is a robopsychologist. He is introduced as being Calvin's successor in the story "Feminine Intuition".

== R. Daneel Olivaw ==
R. Daneel Olivaw is a humaniform robot (android). The "R" initial in his name stands for "robot," a naming convention in Asimov's future society in which all robot names start with the initial R to differentiate them from humans, whom they often resemble. He is a major character in the Robot series, as well as having important roles in the prequels and sequels to the original Foundation Trilogy. Built by Han Fastolfe, he was first assigned to help Elijah Baley solve the murder of his co-creator Roj Nemennuh Sarton, and later teams up with Baley for other detective work.

With R. Giskard Reventlov, a robot with unique telepathic powers, he develops the "Zeroth Law of Robotics," a modification of/addition to the original Three Laws of Robotics, and is given Giskard's powers shortly before Giskard shuts down. He reappears later in the Foundation saga novels.

== Powell and Donovan ==
Gregory Powell and Mike Donovan are fictional characters from Isaac Asimov's Robot short stories. They are practical engineers rather than theoretical roboticists, field specialists for U.S. Robots and Mechanical Men, and are employed mainly on testing new or experimental robots in practical situations — either on planets or space stations (robots are banned on Earth). They regularly get into complex and potentially dangerous situations when trying to solve robot issues in the field. The issues typically involve the Three Laws of Robotics. The two are easily distinguishable as Powell sported a mustache and was the calmer of the two while Donovan had red hair and was excitable.

They are mainly comical characters, but they also explore the logical contradictions behind some of the applications of the Three Laws of Robotics. Their adventures stand out in stark contrast to the indoor exploits of Susan Calvin, a dour robopsychologist working for the same company. The characters Powell and Donovan appear in "Runaround", "Reason", "Catch that Rabbit" and "Escape!". Donovan also appears in "First Law". In the Foundation's Friends tribute anthology, they appear in Poul Anderson's story "Plato's Cave", and an elderly Donovan appears in Harry Harrison's "The Fourth Law of Robotics".

In "The Prophet", an episode of British television series Out of the Unknown, based on the short story "Reason", Powell was played by David Healy, and Donovan by Brian Davies. The character Mike Donovan from the V science fiction franchise was named after Asimov's character.

== R. Giskard Reventlov ==
R. Giskard Reventlov is a pre-humaniform robot, designed and built on Aurora by Han Fastolfe, and a lifelong companion of Fastolfe. As an unintended result of experiments in programming carried out on him by Fastolfe's student daughter Vasilia Fastolfe, Giskard was given the ability to read and influence emotions of humans and robots.

"I, alone, however, am aware of human emotions and of casts of mind, so that I know of more subtle forms of injury without being able to understand them completely [...] Emotions are readily apparent, thoughts are not."

R. Daneel Olivaw hypothesised the "Zeroth Law of Robotics," as a preface to the Three Laws of Robotics - after a conversation with Elijah Bailey on his deathbed. With Daneel's help and justification of the Zeroth Law, Giskard was able to prevent Kelden Amadiro's destruction of the Earth—though the same law led him to allow a gradual destruction of the Earth through radioactive increases, which would encourage the colonization of the Galaxy. Ultimately his juxtaposition to the Zeroth Law eventually led to the freezing of his brain. Just before he shuts down, he transfers his telepathic abilities to R. Daneel Olivaw.

== Lawrence Robertson ==
Lawrence Robertson (1992–2035 in the film) is the co-founder of U.S. Robots and Mechanical Men, the largest robots and advanced technologies company in Asimov's world. His first appearance is in the story "Liar!".
