= The Caves of Steel =

1954 novel by Isaac Asimov

- Cover of first edition (hardcover)
- Author: Isaac Asimov
- Cover artist: Ruth Ray
- Language: English
- Series: Robot series
- Genre: Mystery Science fiction
- Publisher: Doubleday
- Publication date: 1953 (magazine), 4 February 1954 (book)
- Publication place: United States
- Media type: Print (Hardcover, Paperback)
- Pages: 224
- Preceded by: "Mother Earth"
- Followed by: The Naked Sun

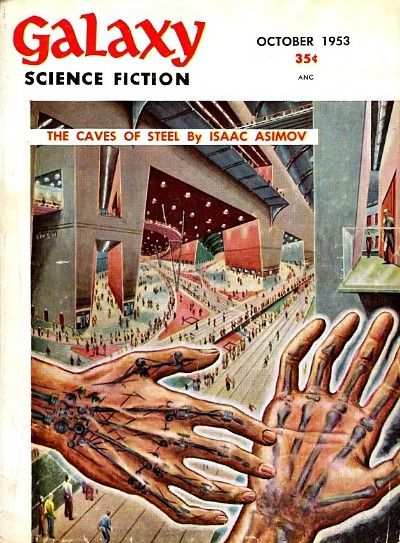
The first instalment of Asimov's The Caves of Steel took the cover of the October 1953 issue of Galaxy Science Fiction, illustrated by Ed Emshwiller.

The Caves of Steel is a science fiction novel by American writer Isaac Asimov. It is a detective story and illustrates an idea Asimov advocated, that science fiction can be applied to any literary genre, rather than just being a limited genre in itself.

The book was first published as a serial in Galaxy magazine, from October to December 1953. A Doubleday hardcover followed in 1954.

At the time of writing, Asimov conceived of The Caves of Steel as completely distinct from his Foundation trilogy, published a few years earlier. Decades later, however, Asimov linked them, making the time of Caves of Steel a much earlier part of an extensive future history leading up to the rise of the Galactic Empire, its fall and the rise of two Foundations to replace it – with the Robot R. Daneel Olivaw, introduced in Caves of Steel, turning out to have survived over tens of thousands of years and have played a key role in the eras of both the Empire and the Foundation(s).

== Setup ==
Isaac Asimov introduces Elijah Baley and R. Daneel Olivaw, later his favorite protagonists. They live roughly three millennia in Earth's future, a time when hyperspace travel has been discovered and a few worlds relatively close to Earth have been colonized – fifty planets known as the "Spacer worlds". The Spacer worlds are rich, have low population density (average population of one hundred million each), and use robot labor heavily.

Meanwhile, Earth is overpopulated with eight billion people, three times that of Asimov's 1950s, with strict rules against robots. In The Caves of Steel and its sequels, the first of which is The Naked Sun, Asimov paints a grim situation of an Earth dealing with an extremely large population and of luxury-seeking Spacers, who limit birth to permit great wealth and privacy.

Asimov was a claustrophile: "I wrote a novel in 1953 which pictured a world in which everyone lived in underground cities, comfortably enclosed away from the open air. People would say, 'How could you imagine such a nightmarish situation?' And I would answer in astonishment, 'What nightmarish situation?'".

The "caves of steel" are vast city complexes covered by huge metallic domes, capable of supporting tens of millions each: the New York City of that era, where much of the story is set, encompasses present-day New York City as well as large tracts of New Jersey. Asimov imagines the present day underground transit connected to malls and apartment blocks, until no one ever exits the domes and most of the population suffer from extreme fear of leaving them. Even though the Robot and Foundation series were not made part of the same fictional universe until much later, the "caves of steel" resemble the planet Trantor.

The novel's central plot device is a murder, which takes place before it opens. This is an Asimov trademark, which he attributed to his squeamishness, plus John Campbell's advice to begin as late in the story as possible. The victim is Roj Nemmenuh Sarton, a Spacer Ambassador who lives in Spacetown, the Spacer outpost just outside New York City. For some time, he has tried to convince the Earth government to loosen its anti-robot restrictions.

One morning, he is discovered outside his home, his chest imploded by an energy blaster. The New York police commissioner charges Elijah with finding the murderer, in cooperation with a highly advanced robot named R. Daneel Olivaw, who is visually identical to a human and equipped with a scanner that can detect human emotions through their encephalographic waves.

== Plot ==
A faction of Spacers have come to the realization that Spacer culture is effete, stagnating due to negative population growth and excessive longevity. Their solution is to encourage further space exploration and colonization by Earthmen in concert with robots. However, Earthmen would first need to overcome their irrational antagonism toward robots. To this end, the faction have established habitations on Earth, through which they hope to introduce humanoid robots to Earth.

Officer Elijah Baley starts working with R. (robot) Olivaw, whom he distrusts on the basis of being an android. Olivaw gradually learns more about Earth humans and displays curiosity about aspects of local behaviour and technology. While investigating the murder of Spacer Dr. Sarton, Baley makes a visit to Spacetown and meets with Dr. Fastolfe, who injects him with a suggestive drug, while speaking about the relative merits and shortcomings of Earth and Spacer society. Baley is converted to the cause of spreading humanity throughout the galaxy.

Although the Spacers deem Baley inadequate to convert enough Earthmen, they find their target when Baley arrests Clousarr on suspicion of inciting a riot, and Olivaw provides him with suggestive statements. Their job accomplished, the Spacers make plans to leave Earth, as their continued presence would be to the detriment of their cause. They accept Sarton's unsolved death as a necessary sacrifice. This leaves Baley with ninety minutes to find the killer, which he is convinced will also clear him of the destruction of R. Sammy.

Meanwhile, the New York Police Commissioner, Julius Enderby, has been acting suspiciously. He is Baley's friend from college, now his boss, and the head of the investigation on Earth. Baley eventually deduces Enderby is secretly a member of the Medievalists, a subversive anti-robot group which pines for the 'olden days', where men did not live in the 'caves of steel'. He used his position of power in order to set up meetings with Sarton, under the guise of further cooperation, while actually plotting to kill R. Daneel, who was living with Sarton prior to the murder.

The murder required the knowledge and skills of one human – Enderby – and one robot – R. Sammy. Enderby ordered R. Sammy to carry a blaster weapon from the city to Spacetown through the "country", an area outside the domes that make up the caves of steel, an area with little to no monitoring by police, but where few if any Earthmen would dare go. In Spacetown, Enderby took the weapon from R. Sammy, and after being done, he gave the blaster back, so the investigators in Spacetown would never find the murder weapon.

At no point did he need to tell R. Sammy why he wanted a weapon, so the plan did not break the First Law. In Enderby's nervousness about committing a crime, he compulsively cleaned the lenses of his eyeglasses and accidentally dropped them, breaking them. Because of this, he could not tell the difference between Sarton and R. Daneel, who Sarton designed and built to look as much like himself as a robot can. When he tried to kill R. Daneel, he killed Sarton instead. As a confirmation of his hypothesis, Baley plays a video recording of the crime scene investigation. It shows the room where Sarton was killed, Sarton's body, and pieces of glass, which can be tested to see whether they came from Enderby's eyeglasses.

Having already accepted that Sarton's death is unsolved, the Spacers are willing to not prosecute Enderby for the accident if he agrees to work with them to promote colonization of other worlds amongst the Medievalists.

== Characters ==
In order of appearance, described:

- Elijah "Lije" Baley, a plain-clothes police officer who works on Earth. He is called to solve the murder.
- Vince Barrett, a young man whose job was taken over by R. Sammy.
- R. Sammy, a robot assigned to the Police Department
- Julius Enderby, New York City's Commissioner of Police, who assigns Baley to the murder case.
- Jezebel "Jessie" Navodny Baley, Baley's wife
- Roj Nemennuh Sarton, a spacer roboticist murdered with a blaster. Baley is assigned to investigate his death.
- R. Daneel Olivaw, Baley's partner, a humaniform robot created in Sarton's likeness
- Bentley Baley, Baley's son
- Han Fastolfe, a roboticist from Aurora, a Spacer world, who believes Spacers and Earth dwellers must work together to colonize the galaxy and survive in the future.
- Dr. Anthony Gerrigel, a roboticist at Washington whom Baley calls
- Francis Clousarr, a New Yorker who was arrested for inciting a riot against robots two years ago. Daneel identifies him as being present at two incidents.

== Reception ==
In 1954, reviewer Groff Conklin praised the novel for the way Asimov "combines his interest in robotics with his consuming preoccupation with the sociology of a technology-mad, bureaucratically tethered world of tomorrow." Boucher and McComas praised The Caves of Steel as "Asimov's best long work to date", saying that it was "the most successful attempt yet to combine" the detective and science fiction novel.

P. Schuyler Miller called it "as honest a combination of science fiction and detection as we've seen." Villiers Gerson of The New York Times wrote: "Here is an unusually exciting and engrossing detective story set in a science fictional background convincingly worked out."

The Caves of Steel was voted the 30th Best All-Time Novel in the 1975 Locus Poll, and the 33rd Best All-Time SF Novel in the 1987 Locus Poll. In 2004, the book was nominated for a retroactive Hugo Award for Best Novel for 1954.

== Adaptations ==
The novel was adapted for television by the BBC and shown in 1964: only a few short excerpts still exist. In June 1989, the book was adapted by Bert Coules as a radio play for the BBC, with Ed Bishop as Elijah Baley and Sam Dastor as R. Daneel Olivaw. In 2016, Akiva Goldsman had been hired to produce a movie. In 2025, John Ridley was hired to direct a film adaptation, co-writing the script with Cheo Hodari Coker.

=== Television adaptation ===
The Caves of Steel
- Also known as: Story Parade – The Caves of Steel
- Genre: Science fiction
- Written by: Terry Nation
- Directed by: Peter Sasdy
- Starring: Peter Cushing; John Carson
- Music by: BBC Radiophonic Workshop
- Country of origin: United Kingdom
- Original language: English

Production
- Producer: Eric Tayler
- Running time: 75 minutes

Original release
- Network: BBC2
- Release: 5 June 1964

An adaptation of The Caves of Steel was produced by the BBC and broadcast on BBC2 on 5 June 1964 as part of an anthology strand called Story Parade, which specialized in adaptations of modern novels. It starred Peter Cushing as Elijah Baley and John Carson as R. Daneel Olivaw. The adaptation was the brainchild of Story Parade story editor Irene Shubik, who was an enthusiast of science fiction and once described Asimov as "one of the most interesting and amusing men I have ever met". Shubik had previously devised and story edited the science fiction anthology series Out of This World, which had adapted Asimov's short story "Little Lost Robot" in 1962. The adaptation of the novel was handled by Terry Nation, who by then had created the Daleks for Doctor Who.

The screenplay was generally faithful to the plot of the novel. The only major deviation was the conclusion – in the television version the murderer commits suicide when he is unmasked, although in the novel he agrees to work to convince the Medievalists to change their ways. The other major change is that the roboticist Dr. Gerrigel is a female character in the television version.

The Caves of Steel garnered good reviews: The Daily Telegraph said the play "proved again that science fiction can be exciting, carry a message and be intellectually stimulating" while The Listener, citing the play as the best of the Story Parade series, described it as "a fascinating mixture of science fiction and whodunit which worked remarkably well".

The play was repeated on BBC1 on 28 August 1964. As was common practice at the time, the master videotapes of The Caves of Steel were wiped some time after broadcast and the play remains missing. A few short extracts survive: the opening titles and the murder of Sarton; Elijah and Daneel meeting Dr. Gerrigel (Naomi Chance) and Elijah and Daneel confronting the Medievalist Clousarr (John Boyd-Brent).

The success of The Caves of Steel led Irene Shubik to devise the science fiction anthology series Out of the Unknown, during which she oversaw the adaptation of six more Asimov stories, including The Caves of Steel's sequel The Naked Sun.

Cast of BBC 2 Adaptation:

- Peter Cushing as Elijah Baley
- John Carson as R Daneel Olivaw
- Kenneth J. Warren as Commissioner Julius Enderby
- John Wentworth as Dr Han Fastolfe
- Ellen McIntosh as Jessie Baley
- Ian Trigger as R Sammy
- Stanley Walsh as Simpson
- John Boyd-Brent as Francis Cloussar
- Naomi Chance as Dr Gerrigel
- Hennie Scott as Bentley Baley
- Richard Beale as Controller
- Richard Beint as Shop Manager
- Patsy Smart as Customer

=== Radio adaptation ===
In 1989, BBC Radio 4 broadcast an adaptation by Bert Coules, directed by Matthew Walters and starring Ed Bishop as Baley with Sam Dastor as Olivaw.

Cast of BBC Radio 4 Adaptation:

- Ed Bishop as Elijah Baley
- Sam Dastor as R Daneel Olivaw
- Matt Zimmerman as Commissioner Julius Enderby
- Christopher Good as Dr Han Fastolfe
- Beth Porter as Jessie Baley
- Ian Michie as R Sammy
- Vincent Brimble as Simpson
- Elizabeth Mansfield as Frances Cloussar
- Brian Miller as the Shopkeeper
- Boris Hunker as Bentley Baley
- Susan Sheridan as City Announcer

=== Game adaptation ===
In 1988, Kodak produced a VCR game entitled Isaac Asimov's Robots that contained a 45-minute film loosely based on The Caves of Steel. It featured many of the characters and settings from the novel, but an altered plotline to fit the needs of a VCR game. Elements from The Robots of Dawn, including the characters Giskard Reventlov and Kelden Amadiro, were incorporated. Similar to the BBC2 version, Dr. Gerrigel was replaced by a woman, named Sophia Quintana, after an unrelated character from Robots and Empire.

Cast of Isaac Asimov's Robots:

- Valarie Pettiford as Newscaster
- Stephen Rowe as Elijah Baley
- Richard Levine as R. Sammy
- Larry Block as Commissioner Julius Enderby
- Brent Barrett as R. Daneel Olivaw
- John Henry Cox as Dr. Han Fastolfe
- Eric Tull as R. Giskard Reventlov and R. Borgraf
- George Merritt as Kelden Amadiro
- Darrie Lawrence as Sophia Quintana
- Debra Jo Rupp as R. Jane
- Eleni Kelakos as Vasilia Fastolfe

== Sources ==
- Cutler, Colin (1999). "Story Parade: The Caves of Steel". 625.org. Archived from the original on 2 October 2006.
- Ward, Mark (2004). Out of the Unknown: A Guide to the legendary BBC series. Bristol: Kaleidoscope. ISBN 1-900203-10-3.
