= Mirror Image (short story) =

1972 short story by Isaac Asimov

- Short story by Isaac Asimov
- Country: United States
- Language: English
- Genre: Science fiction

Publication
- Published in: Analog Science Fiction and Fact
- Publisher: Condé Nast
- Media type: Magazine
- Publication date: May 1972

Chronology
- Series: Robot series
The Naked Sun	The Robots of Dawn

"Mirror Image" is a science fiction short story by American writer Isaac Asimov, originally published in the May 1972 issue of Analog Science Fiction and Fact. It was later collected in The Best of Isaac Asimov (1973), The Complete Robot (1982), Robot Visions (1990), and The Complete Stories, Volume 2 (1992).

After receiving many requests to continue the story of detective Elijah Baley and his robot partner R. Daneel Olivaw, featured in his earlier novels The Caves of Steel and The Naked Sun, Asimov wrote this short detective story. Following its publication, he received numerous letters from readers stating, "Thanks, but we mean a novel."

== Plot summary ==
Baley is unexpectedly contacted by Daneel regarding a dispute between two reputable Spacers aboard a ship. Both have submitted essentially identical papers on a revolutionary mathematical technique, each claiming to have originated the idea. Each asserts that they merely approached the other for confirmation, only to have their concept stolen. Neither will admit guilt, and resolving the authorship dispute before arriving at the planet where the papers are to be presented is crucial to maintaining the ship’s captain's reputation. Daneel, recognizing Baley as an unbiased outsider, suggests him to the desperate captain.

Both Spacers have personal robots—identical models from the same production batch—who were privy to their discussions under identical circumstances. However, like their masters, the robots provide conflicting accounts, mirroring each other perfectly. One must be telling the truth, while the other is lying to protect its master's reputation. As Spacers, the mathematicians refuse to speak directly with an Earthman, but they permit Baley to conduct unofficial interviews with their robots via telepresence. When questioned, both robots state they would lie to protect a human's reputation. Baley then capitalizes on a key difference between their masters: one is elderly and nearing the end of a distinguished career, while the other, though brilliant, has yet to fully establish himself.

Baley presents a tailored argument to each robot. To the younger mathematician’s robot, he suggests that its master could still rebuild his reputation, whereas an elder’s career-ending scandal would permanently tarnish his legacy. Conversely, he tells the elder mathematician’s robot that its master’s reputation is well-established, while the younger man’s career would be completely ruined by an early disgrace. This psychological manipulation has an immediate effect: the younger mathematician’s robot changes its testimony to protect the elder man, while the elder mathematician’s robot, struggling with the conflict, malfunctions and shuts down.

Since Baley attempted to persuade both robots to change their accounts, he deduces that the elder mathematician is the plagiarist. If the younger mathematician’s robot had not been instructed to lie, it could easily switch sides. In contrast, if the elder mathematician’s robot had been ordered to lie but then felt compelled to tell the truth, it could not easily override its directive of its own volition—especially when only a reputation, rather than a human life, was at stake—leading to internal conflict and shutdown.

R. Daneel later reports that Baley's deduction was correct, as the captain has extracted a confession. However, Daneel notes that Baley, not being a robopsychologist, could have interpreted the robots’ behavior in reverse: a robot might override an instruction to lie if compelled to tell the truth, whereas a truth-telling robot might malfunction if forced to lie. Baley acknowledges this possibility but maintains that his initial suspicion was logically sound: a younger man developing a novel idea would be likely to seek input from an esteemed mentor, while an older man preparing for a prestigious conference would be unlikely to consult a perceived upstart. Thus, Baley only used the robots’ reactions to reinforce his theory and provoke the elder mathematician into confessing.

Preceded by: The Naked Sun	Included in: The Complete Robot; Robot Visions	Series: Robot series Foundation Series	Followed by: The Robots of Dawn
