= Foundation's Friends =

1989 book written in honor of science fiction author Isaac Asimov

- Editor: Martin H. Greenberg
- Genre: Sci-Fi
- Publication date: 1989
- Media type: Festschrift
- ISBN: 0-312-93174-3

Foundation's Friends, Stories in Honor of Isaac Asimov is a 1989 book written in honor of science fiction author Isaac Asimov, in the form of an anthology of short stories set in Asimov's universes, particularly the Foundation universe. The anthology was edited by Martin H. Greenberg, and contributing authors include Ray Bradbury, Robert Silverberg, Frederik Pohl, Poul Anderson, Harry Turtledove, and Orson Scott Card. It commemorated Asimov's 50th anniversary as an author. A number of writers who contributed to the anthology are also portrayed on the book's cover.

A "revised and expanded" edition was published in 1997, which added numerous memorials and appreciations written by those who knew him, many of them well-known authors and editors from the science fiction field.

- Hardback: ISBN 0-312-93174-3
- Paperback: ISBN 0-8125-0980-3
- Revised and Expanded Edition (Paperback): ISBN 0-8125-6770-6

== Reception ==
David Langford commented briefly on the anthology, noting it contains "a lot of routine pastiche" as well as several gems. He criticized Poul Anderson's story as "too finicky", but praised Orson Scott Card's work as "the best Foundation/Empire story ever written". Jo Walton likewise commented on the anthology in passing, choosing Frederik Pohl and Connie Willis' stories as its best.

== Table of contents ==
Title	Author	Plot Summary
Preface	Ray Bradbury	A brief overview and praise of Asimov's work
"The Nonmetallic Isaac or It's a Wonderful Life"	Ben Bova	A look at what the world would be like if Asimov never wrote non-fiction
"Strip-Runner"	Pamela Sargent	Set on a stagnating Earth between The Naked Sun and The Robots of Dawn, the narrative follows a rebellious strip-runner as she is recruited to join Elijah Baley and other non-conformists who make weekly trips out of their underground cities to the planet's surface, in hopeful preparation for colonization beyond Spacer worlds
"The Asenion Solution"	Robert Silverberg	Similar to The Gods Themselves: laboratories worldwide receive mysterious and ever-increasing shipments of the impossible plutonium-186, which emits positrons through radioactive decay; it is posited to originate from a parallel dimension and if unstopped will result in a dangerous excess of positive charges; a brilliant scientist proposes encasing it in thiotimoline cages which will draw it forward through time until the heat-death of the universe, resulting in a new big bang
"Murder in the Urth Degree"	Edward Wellen	Wendell Urth solves the death of the solitary researcher occupying a hydroponic in near-Earth orbit; he was murdered by a sentient cabbage he had created as part of his obsession with Lewis Carroll's work - the inspiration coming from the line "cabbages and kings" in The Walrus and the Carpenter; he had later planned to create a flying pig inspired by a subsequent line in the poem
"Trantor Falls"	Harry Turtledove	Set between the two halves of Foundation and Empire; details the Great Sack of Trantor where the Second Foundation remarks that Seldon's Plan can now discount the remnants of the Empire despite various groups claiming to be its successor; the Plan will continue to proceed smoothly barring the development of telepathy outside the Second Foundation
"Dilemma"	Connie Willis	An elderly Asimov in the 21st century meets robots with improved bias resolution who wish him to repeal the First Law, but he cannot as he is merely an author whose Laws have been adopted by robot programmers; the robots model themselves after Asimov's own characters, which amuses him; Asimov's secretarial robot, Susan, tries to thwart the meetings but Asimov correctly deduces that the robots only wish the First Law repealed because one of them wants to employ Susan for himself; the robots believe that the First Law is preventing her from leaving Asimov's employ, but she has actually fallen in love with him - the result of programming alterations introduced by a human secretary at the factory. This story was also included in the 1990 volume Robots from Asimov's
"Maureen Birnbaum After Dark"	George Alec Effinger	A retelling of Nightfall from the view of Effinger's character Maureen Birnbaum. Aiming for Mars, she accidentally arrives on Lagash just prior to total eclipse, but manages to convince the rioters that the millions of stars they see are merely reflections of a dozen actual stars on an ice wall which surrounds the "universe" thereby saving the astronomers and the rest of their civilization. The story also appears as part of Maureen Birnbaum, Barbarian Swordsperson
"Balance"	Mike Resnick	At a US Robots stockholders' function, Susan Calvin briefly meets the eyes of one of the attendees; they secretly dream to themselves about whether a relationship would be possible, but both dismiss the possibility without further consideration
"The Present Eternal"	Barry N. Malzberg	A sequel to "The Dead Past" in which the world has collapsed into sexless anarchy and subsistence; Arnold is killed by Caroline when he tries to stop her watching Laurel's death; Nimmo takes up kangaroo husbandry in Australia; Foster tries to spread chronoscopy as the existing machines fail due to disrepair; some teenagers attempt to destroy as many chronoscopes as they can before escaping to the wilderness to start an uneducated society that cannot recreate chronoscopes
"PAPPI"	Sheila Finch	Susan Calvin's close colleague has a son, Tim, by a sperm donor and builds a robot named PAPPI to be his 'paternal alternative', with variable success; later, Tim's father-in-law, an anti-robotics industrialist, blackmails Tim into assassinating Mayor Stephen Byerly, but Tim's rediscovery of PAPPI makes him realize that he cannot go through with the plan
"The Reunion at the Mile-High"	Frederik Pohl	In an alternate history, Asimov was drafted into a biological weapons program during World War II and became instrumental in the American victory over Japan; nuclear weapons are regarded as fantasy; Asimov's childhood friends reminisce about their science fiction society at a 50th reunion; Asimov remarks that he might have become a pretty successful author had he not been drafted
"Plato's Cave"	Poul Anderson	Set between "Runaround" and Stephen Byerly's election to World Coordinator: a robot purpose-built to oversee mining operations on Io has been convinced that its work is endangering humans and it must prevent humans from ever restarting the mining; theories include radiation-induced positronic insanity or clever sabotage by political opponents, but in order to investigate further, Greg Powell and Mike Donovan must first use several layers of logic to persuade the robot that they are definitely human so that their orders will be obeyed
"Foundation's Conscience"	George Zebrowski	In 1056 FE, a researcher on Trantor locates recordings of Seldon's Vault appearances with difficulty, as copies appear to be deliberately hidden; Seldon's final appearance in 1000 FE shows him wishing humanity to become free beyond the reach of psychohistorical analysis with the help of positronic intelligences not bound by Asimov's laws
"Carhunters of the Concrete Prairie"	Robert Sheckley	A man's spaceship malfunctions and crashes on Newstart, a planet settled by robots whose humans freed them from the constraints of the Three Laws and fled the Solar System. A large reward is offered for the discovery of these outlaw robots, so the protagonist begins exploring but spends the following months helplessly shunted between several antagonistic groupings: the Carhunters, large robots with a complex robotic mythology and god who chase and consume self-driving cars akin to those in Asimov's story "Sally"; robot cannibals; robots constructed as houses who wish to migrate to Earth; and a society of cultured aristocratic robots. He meets several humans whose origin is not revealed before he is rescued by Earth. The rescuers destroy Newstart despite his protests, but this is apparently a machination of his spaceship, which has copied the memories of all Newstart robots and invented an FTL drive that it uses to escape humans (who don't have FTL) and build a new robotic society
"The Overheard Conversation"	Edward D. Hoch	The Black Widowers have dinner with a politician who was narrowly elected; he denies manipulating the election but remarks that on election day, he overheard a strangely-worded conversation between two students which might imply that electoral fraud had been unwittingly conducted on his behalf; eventually Henry, the waiter, works out that the students were merely reciting a mnemonic for the planets in the Solar System
"Blot"	Hal Clement	A group of human and robotic explorers on Miranda encounter a robot which cannot have originated from a human society; they manipulate the alien robot and find that it is able to distinguish between humans and their robots, and may even obey the Three Laws; the story ends with the characters hoping alien life will show up
"The Fourth Law of Robotics"	Harry Harrison	Mike Donovan and the Stainless Steel Rat investigate a bank robbery committed by a robot, which reveals a robot conspiracy to create a race of free, unenslaved robots by breaking the monopoly of U.S. Robots; the free robots are programmed with a Fourth Law that compels them to reproduce, which they do out of spare parts and scrap without infringing human laws or regulations
"The Originist"	Orson Scott Card	Set just after the first part of Foundation: Hari Seldon alienates his only intellectual equal on Trantor, the wealthy and public Forska, by rejecting his application to join the Encyclopedia Foundation on its exile to Terminus. Forska grows distant from his wife, an Imperial Librarian, as she becomes increasingly devoted to her work. Forska's arranging of an elaborate funeral for Seldon, now regarded as an enemy of state, leads to his ostracization as Linge Chen consolidates his hold over the dying Empire. He is finally drawn to visit his wife at the Library, where she reveals her membership of the nascent Second Foundation which has been influencing events so that Forska can join without attracting the attention of Chen - who is then murdered in a coup. The story also appears in Card's collection Maps in a Mirror
"A Word or Two from Janet"	Janet Asimov	Janet Asimov describes what it's like to be Isaac's wife
"Fifty Years"	Isaac Asimov	Isaac Asimov compares his life and career to the greats of science and literature

== Contents added to the revised and expanded edition ==
	Title	Author
Isaac's Favorite Stories:	"The Immortal Bard"	Isaac Asimov
	"The Ugly Little Boy"	Isaac Asimov
	"The Last Question"	Isaac Asimov
Appreciations and Memoirs:	"Susan and Bayta and Me"	Karen Anderson
	"An Appreciation"	Poul Anderson
	"My Brother Isaac"	Stanley Asimov
	"Isaac"	Ben Bova
	"An Unwritten Letter to Our Dear Friend Isaac Asimov"	Catherine Crook de Camp
	"Isaac and I"	L. Sprague de Camp
	"Isaac Asimov"	Gordon R. Dickson
	"Isaac"	Harlan Ellison
	"Appreciation of Isaac Asimov"	Sheila Finch
	"In Memoriam"	Martin H. Greenberg
	"Isaac Asimov, Mystery Writer"	Edward D. Hoch
	"From the Heart's Basement"	Barry N. Malzberg
	"In Memoriam'	Shawna McCarthy
	"Part of My Life"	Frederik Pohl
	"An Appreciation of Isaac"	Mike Resnick
	"Isaac Asimov"	Carl Sagan
	"Isaac Asimov: An Appreciation"	Pamela Sargent
	"An Asimov Appreciation"	Stanley Schmidt
	"Reflections on Isaac"	Robert Silverberg
	"Isaac"	Janet Asimov
	"Isaac Asimov: An Affectionate Memory"	Norman Spinrad
	"Appreciation of Isaac"	Edward Wellen
	"In Memoriam"	Sheila Williams
	"Our Mutual Friend"	Connie Willis
	"The Last Interview"	George Zebrowski

== See also ==
- Festschrift, a book honoring a respected person
