= Foundation (novel series) =

Science-fiction novel series by Isaac Asimov

- First edition dust jacket of Foundation
- Isaac Asimov: Foundation (1951); Foundation and Empire (1952); Second Foundation (1953); Foundation's Edge (1982); Foundation and Earth (1986); Prelude to Foundation (1988); Forward the Foundation (1993); Other authors: Foundation's Fear (1997) by Gregory Benford; Foundation and Chaos (1998) by Greg Bear; Foundation's Triumph (1999) by David Brin
- Author: Isaac Asimov
- Country: United States
- Language: English
- Genre: Science fiction
- Publisher: Astounding Science Fiction (Street & Smith), Gnome Press, Spectra, Doubleday
- Published: 1942–1993
- Media type: Print

The Foundation series is a science fiction novel series written by American author Isaac Asimov. It was first published as a series of short stories and novellas in 1942–1950, and subsequently as three novels in 1951–1953: Foundation (1951), Foundation and Empire (1952), and Second Foundation (1953). Known as The Foundation Trilogy for nearly thirty years, it won the one-time Hugo Award for "Best All-Time Series" in 1966. Asimov later added volumes, with two sequels, Foundation's Edge (1982) and Foundation and Earth (1986), and two prequels, Prelude to Foundation (1988) and Forward the Foundation (1993).

The premise of the stories is that in the waning days of a future Galactic Empire, the mathematician Hari Seldon devises the theory of psychohistory, a new and effective mathematics of sociology. Using statistical laws of mass action, it can predict the future of large populations. Seldon foresees the imminent fall of the Empire, which encompasses the entire Milky Way, and a dark age lasting 30,000 years before a second empire arises. Although the momentum of the Empire's fall is too great to stop, Seldon devises a plan by which "the onrushing mass of events must be deflected just a little" to eventually limit this interregnum to just one thousand years. The novels describe some of the dramatic events of those years as they are shaped by the underlying political and social mechanics of Seldon's Plan.

== Publication history ==
=== Original stories ===
The original trilogy of novels collected a series of eight short stories and novellas published in Astounding Science-Fiction magazine between May 1942 and January 1950. According to Asimov, the premise was based on ideas in Edward Gibbon's History of the Decline and Fall of the Roman Empire, and was invented spontaneously on his way to meet with editor John W. Campbell, with whom he developed the concepts of the collapse of the Galactic Empire, the civilization-preserving Foundations, and psychohistory. Asimov wrote these early stories in his West Philadelphia apartment when he worked at the Philadelphia Naval Yard.

=== Foundation trilogy ===
The first four stories were collected, along with a new introductory story, and published by Gnome Press in 1951 as Foundation. The later stories were published in pairs by Gnome as Foundation and Empire (1952) and Second Foundation (1953), resulting in the "Foundation Trilogy", as the series is still known.

=== Later sequels and prequels ===
In 1981, Asimov's publishers persuaded him to write a fourth novel, which became Foundation's Edge (1982). Four years later, Asimov followed up with another sequel, Foundation and Earth (1986), which was followed by the prequels Prelude to Foundation (1988) and Forward the Foundation (1993), published after his death in 1992.

During the two-year lapse between writing the sequels and prequels, Asimov had tied in his Foundation series with his various other series, creating a single unified universe. The basic link is mentioned in Foundation and Earth: an obscure myth about a first wave of space settlements with robots and then a second without. The idea is the one developed in Robots of Dawn, which, in addition to showing the way that the second wave of settlements was to be allowed, illustrates the benefits and shortcomings of the first wave of settlements and their so-called C/Fe (carbon/iron, signifying humans and robots together) culture. In this same book, the word psychohistory is used to describe the nascent idea of Seldon's work. Some of the drawbacks to this style of colonization, also called Spacer culture, are also exemplified by the events described all the way back in 1957's The Naked Sun. The link between the Robot and Foundation universes was tightened by letting the robot R. Daneel Olivaw – originally introduced in The Caves of Steel – live on for tens of thousands of years and play a major role behind the scenes in both the Galactic Empire in its heyday and in the rise of the two Foundations to take its place.

Collections			Serialization in Astounding Science Fiction	
Publication date	Book title	Story retitle	Original title	Publication date
Original trilogy
1951	Foundation	"The Psychohistorians"	—N/a	
1951	Foundation	"The Encyclopedists"	"Foundation"	May 1942
1951	Foundation	"The Mayors"	"Bridle and Saddle"	June 1942
1951	Foundation	"The Merchant Princes"	"The Big and the Little"	August 1944
1951	Foundation	"The Traders"	"The Wedge"	October 1944
1952	Foundation and Empire	"The General"	"Dead Hand"	April 1945
1952	Foundation and Empire	"The Mule"	"The Mule"	November 1945; December 1945
1953	Second Foundation	"Part I: Search by the Mule"	"Now You See It..."	January 1948
1953	Second Foundation	"Part II: Search by the Foundation"	"...And Now You Don't"	November 1949; December 1949; January 1950
Sequels
1982	Foundation's Edge	—N/a		
1986	Foundation and Earth	—N/a		
Prequels
1988	Prelude to Foundation	—N/a		
1993	Forward the Foundation	—N/a		

== Development and themes ==
The early stories were inspired by Edward Gibbon's The History of the Decline and Fall of the Roman Empire. The plot of the series focuses on the growth and reach of the Foundation, against a backdrop of the "decline and fall of the Galactic Empire." The themes of Asimov's stories were also influenced by the political tendency in science fiction fandom, associated with the Futurians, known as Michelism.

The focus of the novels are the trends through which a civilization might progress, specifically seeking to analyze their progress, using history as a precedent. Although many science fiction novels such as Nineteen Eighty-Four or Fahrenheit 451 do this, their focus is on how current trends in society might come to fruition and they act as a moral allegory of the modern world. The Foundation series, on the other hand, looks at the trends in a wider scope, dealing with societal evolution and adaptation rather than the human and cultural qualities at one point in time. In this Asimov followed the model of Thucydides' work The History of the Peloponnesian War, as he once acknowledged.

The Foundation series also focuses on the impact that women can have over geopolitics, far more than most other works of science fiction at the time. Pamela Sargent talks about how science fiction mostly focused on male-dominated leadership until authors like Ursula K. Le Guin, and Robert Heinlein, a category that Isaac Asimov falls into as well. Though the story does follow 1950's social trends when it comes to gender, as discussed by Clyde Wilcox, many characters find this unsatisfactory and fight for change throughout the long spanning novels.

Asimov tried to end the series with Second Foundation. However, because of the predicted thousand years until the rise of the next Empire (of which only a few hundred had elapsed), the series lacked a sense of closure. For decades, fans pressured him to write a sequel. In 1982, after a 30-year hiatus, Asimov gave in and wrote what was at the time a fourth volume: Foundation's Edge. This was followed shortly thereafter by Foundation and Earth. This novel, which takes place some 500 years after Seldon, ties up all the loose ends and ties all his Robot, Empire, and Foundation novels into a single story. He also opens a brand new line of thought in the last dozen pages regarding Galaxia, a galaxy inhabited by a single collective mind. This concept was never explored further. However, this concept can be found in the Asimov short story, The Last Question, published in 1956. According to his widow Janet Asimov (in her biography of Isaac, It's Been a Good Life), he had no idea how to continue after Foundation and Earth, so he started writing the prequels.

== Asimov's imprecise future history ==
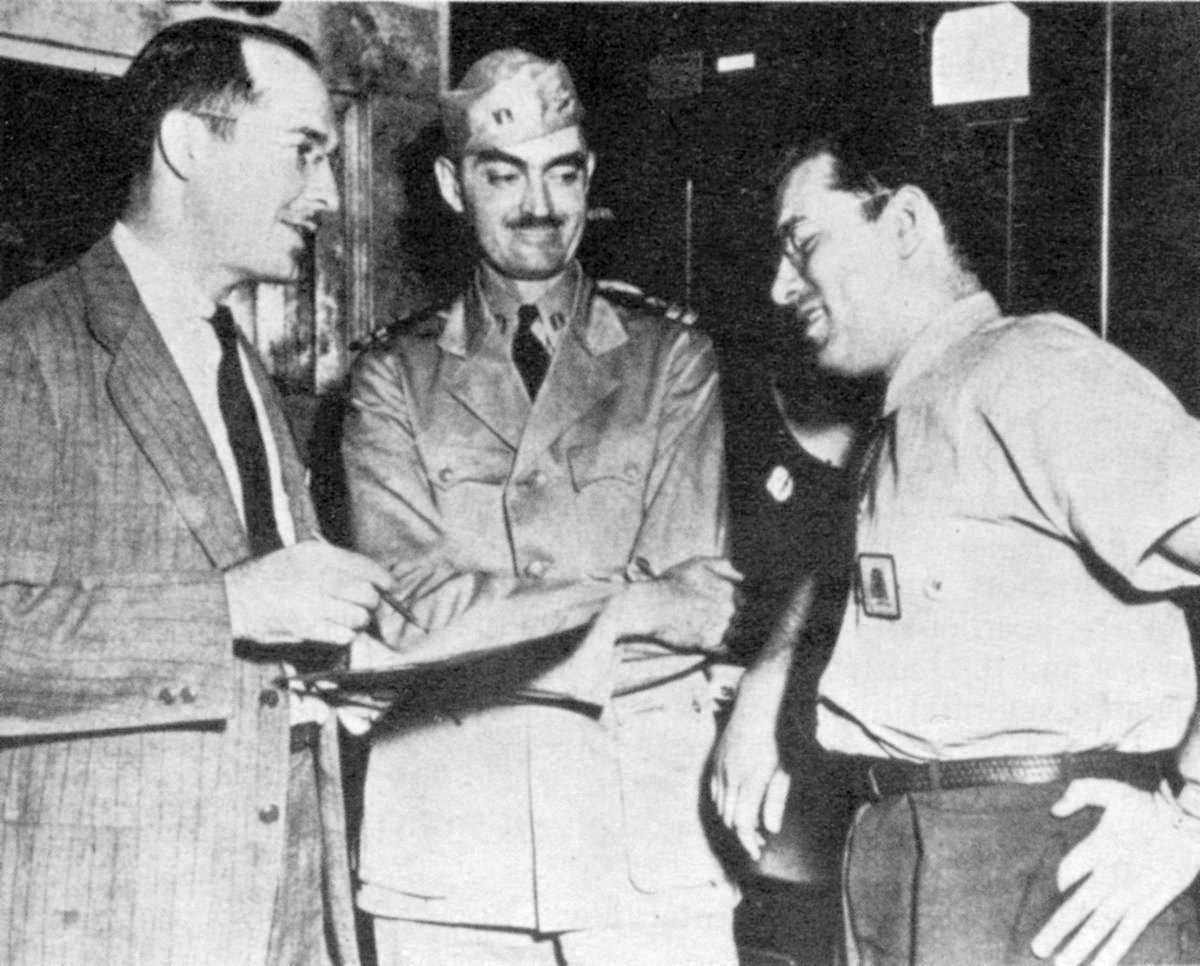
Asimov (right) was inspired by the Future History stories of Heinlein (left – with L. Sprague de Camp in the middle), but self-consciously wrote that his was "not the beautiful job that Heinlein did, but was actually made up 'ad hoc'".

In the spring of 1955, Asimov published a future history of humanity in the pages of Thrilling Wonder Stories magazine based upon his thought processes concerning the Foundation universe at that point in his life. According to the publication, "the scheme was not originally worked out as a consistent pattern and only includes about one-quarter of his total writings". Because of this, the dating in the Foundation series is approximate and inconsistent.

Asimov estimates that his Foundation series takes place nearly 50,000 years into the future, with Hari Seldon born in 47,000 CE. Around this time, the future emperor Cleon I is born in the imperial capital Trantor, 78 years before the Foundation Era (FE) and the events of the original Foundation trilogy. After Cleon inherits the crown, the mathematician Hari Seldon comes to Trantor from Helicon to deliver his theory of psychohistory that predicts the fall of the empire, which triggers the events of Prelude to Foundation. Forward the Foundation picks up the story a few years later, with the emperor being assassinated and Seldon retiring from politics.

At the start of the Foundation Era, the events of the original Foundation novel (first published in Astounding Science Fiction as a series of short stories) take place, and the in-universe Foundation Era truly begins. According to Asimov, he intended this to take place around the year 47000 CE, with the Empire in decay as it battles the rising Foundation, who emerges as the dominant power a few centuries later. Thus begins the events of the Foundation and Empire, which include the unpredicted rise of the Mule, who defeats the Foundation thanks to his mutant abilities. The events of Second Foundation chronicle the titular Second Foundation's search and defeat of the Mule, and their conflict with the remnants of the original Foundation, averting the Dark Age. Asimov estimates that the Mule rises and falls somewhere around 47300 CE.

Foundation's Edge takes place 500 years after the establishment of the Foundation, outside of the original trilogy of novels. Foundation and Earth follows immediately after, with humanity choosing and justifying a third path distinct from the opposing visions of the two Foundations. According to Asimov, the Second Galactic Empire is established 48000 CE, 1000 years after the events of the first novel.

Asimov himself commented that his fiction's internal history was "actually made up ad hoc. My cross-references in the novels are thrown in as they occur to me and did not come from a systemized history. ... If some reader checks my stories carefully and finds that my dating is internally inconsistent, I can only say I'm not surprised."

== Prequel trilogy after Asimov's death ==
A second Foundation trilogy of prequels was written after Asimov's death by three authors, authorized by the Asimov estate. These were Foundation's Fear (1997) by Gregory Benford, Foundation and Chaos (1998) by Greg Bear, and Foundation's Triumph (1999) by David Brin.

== Cultural impact ==
=== Impact in nonfiction ===
In Learned Optimism, psychologist Martin Seligman identifies the Foundation series as one of the most important influences in his professional life, because of the possibility of predictive sociology based on psychological principles. He also lays claim to the first successful prediction of a major historical (sociological) event, in the 1988 US elections, and he specifically attributes this to a psychological principle.

In his 1996 book To Renew America, U.S. House Speaker Newt Gingrich wrote that he was influenced by reading the Foundation trilogy in high school.

Paul Krugman, winner of the 2008 Nobel Memorial Prize in Economic Sciences, credits the Foundation series with turning his mind to economics, as the closest existing science to psychohistory.

Stating that it "offers a useful summary of some of the dynamics of far-flung imperial Rome", Carl Sagan in 1978 listed the Foundation series as an example of how science fiction "can convey bits and pieces, hints and phrases, of knowledge unknown or inaccessible to the reader". In the nonfiction PBS series Cosmos: A Personal Voyage, Sagan referred to an Encyclopedia Galactica in the episodes "Encyclopaedia Galactica" and "Who Speaks for Earth".

=== Awards ===
In 1966, the Foundation trilogy beat several other science fiction and fantasy series to receive a special Hugo Award for "Best All-Time Series". The runners-up for the award were the Barsoom series by Edgar Rice Burroughs, the Future History series by Robert A. Heinlein, the Lensman series by Edward E. Smith and The Lord of the Rings by J. R. R. Tolkien. The Foundation series was the only series so honored until the establishment of the "Best Series" category in 2017. Asimov himself wrote that he assumed the one-time award had been created to honor The Lord of the Rings, and he was amazed when his work won.

The series has won three other Hugo Awards. Foundation's Edge won Best Novel in 1983, and was a bestseller for almost a year. Retrospective Hugo Awards were given in 1996 and 2018 for, respectively, "The Mule" (the major part of Foundation and Empire) for Best Novel (1946), and "Foundation" (the first story written for the series, and second chapter of the first novel) for Best Short Story (1943).

Year	Award	Category	Recipient	Result	Ref.
1956	1956 Hugo Awards	Best Novel	The End of Eternity	Nominated	
1966	1966 Hugo Awards	Best All-Time Series	The Foundation Trilogy	Won	
1973	1973 Locus Awards	Best Reprint Anthology/Collection	The Early Asimov (Note: The collection contains stories "Blind Alley", the only short story in the Galactic Empire series, and novella "Mother Earth".)	5	
1975	1975 Locus Awards	Best Novelette	"—That Thou Art Mindful of Him!"	3	
1975	1975 Hugo Awards	Best Novelette	"—That Thou Art Mindful of Him!"	Nominated	
1975	1975 Locus Poll	Best All-Time Novel	The Foundation Trilogy	6	
1975	1975 Locus Poll	Best All-Time Novel	The Caves of Steel	30	
1977	1976 Nebula Awards	Best Novelette	"The Bicentennial Man"	Won	
1977	1977 Hugo Awards	Best Novelette	"The Bicentennial Man"	Won	
1977	1977 Locus Awards	Best Novelette	"The Bicentennial Man"	Won	
1977	1977 Locus Awards	Best Author Collection	The Bicentennial Man and Other Stories	5	
1983	1982 Nebula Awards	Best Novel	Foundation's Edge	Nominated	
1983	1983 Hugo Awards	Best Novel	Foundation's Edge	Won	
1983	1983 Locus Awards	Best SF Novel	Foundation's Edge	Won	
1983	1983 Locus Awards	Best Single Author Collection	The Complete Robot	7	
1984	1984 Hugo Awards	Best Novel	The Robots of Dawn	Nominated	
1984	1984 Locus Awards	Best SF Novel	The Robots of Dawn	2	
1986	1986 Locus Awards	Best SF Novel	Robots and Empire	4	
1987	1986 Nebula Awards	Best Short Story	"Robot Dreams"	Nominated	
1987	1987 Hugo Awards	Best Short Story	"Robot Dreams"	Nominated	
1987	1987 Locus Awards	Best Short Story	"Robot Dreams"	Won	
1987	1987 Locus Awards	Best SF Novel	Foundation and Earth	5	
1987	1987 Locus Awards	Best Collecttion	Robot Dreams (Note: The nominated collection includes the separately nominated short story of the same title.)	8	
1987	1987 Locus Poll	Best All-Time SF Novel	The Foundation Trilogy	6	
1987	1987 Locus Poll	Best All-Time SF Novel	The Caves of Steel	33	
1989	1989 Locus Awards	Best SF Novel	Prelude to Foundation	4	
1990	1990 Locus Awards	Best Novella	"The Originist" (Note: The novella first appeared in the anthology Foundation's Friends, published in 1989 in honor of Isaac Asimov with his own afterword.) by Orson Scott Card	8	
1993	1993 Locus Awards	Best Novella	"Cleon the Emperor" (Note: The novella is a part of the 1993 Forward the Foundation excerpted for an earlier magazine publication in 1992.)	4	
1994	1994 Locus Awards	Best Collection	Forward the Foundation	5	
1995	1995 Locus Awards	Best Art Book	I, Robot: the Illustrated Screenplay by Harlan Ellison and Isaac Asimov	3	
1996	1946 Retro-Hugo Awards	Best Novella	"Dead Hand" (Note: The novella was originally published in 1945 and, retitled "The General", became the first part of the 1952 novel Foundation and Empire.)	Nominated	
1996	1946 Retro-Hugo Awards	Best Novel	"The Mule" (Note: The novel was originally published in 1945 and later became the second part of the 1952 novel Foundation and Empire.)	Won	
1998	1998 Locus Poll	Best All-Time SF Novel before 1990	The Foundation Trilogy	4	
2001	1951 Retro-Hugo Awards	Best Novel	Pebble in the Sky	Nominated	
2001	1951 Retro-Hugo Awards	Best Novella	"...And Now You Don’t" (Note: The novella was originally serialized in 1949–50 and, retitled "Search by the Foundation", became the second part of the 1953 novel Second Foundation.)	Nominated	
2004	1954 Retro-Hugo Awards	Best Novel	The Caves of Steel	Nominated	
2012	2012 Locus Poll	Best 20th Century SF Novel	The Foundation Trilogy	3	
2012	2012 Locus Poll	Best 20th Century Novelette	"The Bicentennial Man"	4	
2012	2012 Locus Poll	Best 20th Century Novelette	"Foundation" (Note: The novelette was originally published in 1942 and, retitled "The Encyclopedists", became the second part of the 1951 novel Foundation.)	34	
2012	2012 Locus Poll	Best 20th Century Short Story	"Robbie"	29	
2012	2012 Locus Poll	Best 20th Century Short Story	"Liar!"	41	
2016	1941 Retro-Hugo Awards	Best Short Story	"Robbie"	Won	
2018	1943 Retro-Hugo Awards	Best Novelette	"Foundation"	Won	
2018	1943 Retro-Hugo Awards	Best Novelette	"Bridle and Saddle" (Note: The novelette was originally published in 1942 and, retitled "The Mayors", became the third part of the 1951 novel Foundation.)	Nominated	
2018	1943 Retro-Hugo Awards	Best Short Story	"Runaround"	Nominated	
2020	1945 Retro-Hugo Awards	Best Novelette	"The Big and the Little" (aka "The Merchant Princes") (Note: The novelette was originally published in 1944 as "The Big and the Little" and, retitled "The Merchant Princes", became the fifth part of the 1951 novel Foundation.)	Nominated	
2020	1945 Retro-Hugo Awards	Best Short Story	"The Wedge" (aka "The Traders") (Note: The short story was originally published in 1944 as "The Wedge" and, retitled "The Traders", became the fourth part of the 1951 novel Foundation.)	Nominated	
2023	2023 Seiun Awards	Best Translated Long Form	The Foundation Trilogy	Won	

=== Impact in fiction and entertainment ===
Douglas Adams' The Hitchhiker's Guide to the Galaxy mentions the Encyclopedia Galactica by name, remarking that it is rather "dry", and consequently sells fewer copies than the Guide.

Frank Herbert also wrote Dune as a counterpoint to Foundation. Tim O'Reilly in his monograph on Herbert wrote that "Dune is clearly a commentary on the Foundation trilogy. Herbert has taken a look at the same imaginative situation that provoked Asimov's classic—the decay of a galactic empire—and restated it in a way that draws on different assumptions and suggests radically different conclusions. The twist he has introduced into Dune is that the Mule, not the Foundation, is his hero."

In 1995, Donald Kingsbury wrote "Historical Crisis", which he later expanded into a novel, Psychohistorical Crisis. It takes place about 2,000 years after Foundation, after the founding of the Second Galactic Empire. It is set in the same fictional universe as the Foundation series, in considerable detail, but with virtually all Foundation-specific names either changed (e.g., Kalgan becomes Lakgan), or avoided (psychohistory is created by an unnamed, but often-referenced Founder). The novel explores the ideas of psychohistory in a number of new directions, inspired by more recent developments in mathematics and computer science, as well as by new ideas in science fiction itself.

In 1998, the novel Spectre (part of the Shatnerverse series) by William Shatner and Judith and Garfield Reeves-Stevens states that the Mirror Universe divergent path has been studied by the Seldon Psychohistory Institute.

The oboe-like holophonor in Matt Groening's animated television series Futurama is based directly upon the Visi-Sonor which Magnifico plays in Foundation and Empire.

During the 2006–2007 Marvel Comics Civil War crossover storyline, in Fantastic Four #542 Mister Fantastic revealed his own attempt to develop psychohistory, saying he was inspired after reading the Foundation series.

According to lead singer Ian Gillan, the hard rock band Deep Purple's song "The Mule" is based on the Foundation character: "Yes, The Mule was inspired by Asimov. It's been a while but I'm sure you've made the right connection... Asimov was required reading in the 1960s."

=== Adaptations ===
==== Radio ====
An eight-part radio adaptation of the original trilogy, with sound design by the BBC Radiophonic Workshop, was broadcast on BBC Radio 4 in 1973—one of the first BBC radio drama serials to be made in stereo. A BBC 7 rerun commenced in July 2003.

Adapted by Patrick Tull (episodes 1 to 4) and Mike Stott (episodes 5 to 8), the dramatisation was directed by David Cain and starred William Eedle as Hari Seldon, with Geoffrey Beevers as Gaal Dornick, Lee Montague as Salvor Hardin, Julian Glover as Hober Mallow, Dinsdale Landen as Bel Riose, Maurice Denham as Ebling Mis and Prunella Scales as Lady Callia.

==== Film ====
In 1981, producer Michael Phillips attempted to do a film version of the Foundation trilogy in an effort to compete with franchises like Star Wars and Superman in an attempt to pitch the franchise to major film studios, with David Ward writing the screenplay, but it never materialized.

In 1992, TriStar Pictures and Roven/Cavallo Entertainment attempted to purchase the film rights of the trilogy, with Charles Roven and Bob Cavallo attached as producers, but it never materialized. In 1993, Jean-Jacques Annaud was offered to direct and write the screenplay, but it also never materialized. In 1996, TriStar Pictures decided to put the project into turnaround, and transferred the project of the attempted adaptation to New Line Cinema, with Dennis Feldman writing the film screenplay.

By 1998, New Line Cinema had spent $1.5 million developing a film version of the Foundation Trilogy. The failure to develop a new franchise was partly a reason the studio signed on to produce The Lord of the Rings film trilogy.

In 2000, the film project tried again, this time, at 20th Century Fox, for director Shekhar Kapur and producer Vince Gerardis. Screenwriters considered for the job included John Rogers and Jeff Vintar, but the project never came to fruition and went into turnaround again.

On July 29, 2008, New Line Cinema co-founders Bob Shaye and Michael Lynne were reported to have been signed on to produce an adaptation of the trilogy by their company Unique Pictures for Warner Brothers. However, Columbia Pictures (Sony) successfully bid for the screen rights on January 15, 2009, and then contracted Roland Emmerich to direct and produce. Michael Wimer was named as co-producer. Two years later, the studio hired Dante Harper to adapt the books. This project failed to materialize, and HBO acquired the rights when they became available in 2014.

==== Television ====
In November 2014, TheWrap reported that Jonathan Nolan was writing and producing a TV series based on the Foundation Trilogy for HBO. Nolan confirmed his involvement at a Paley Center event on April 13, 2015.

In June 2017, Deadline reported that Skydance Media would produce a TV series. In August 2018 it was announced that Apple TV+ had commissioned a 10 episode straight-to-series order. However, on April 18, 2019, Josh Friedman left the project as co-writer and co-showrunner. This was apparently planned, with either Friedman or screenwriter David Goyer leaving and the other staying. On June 22, 2020, Apple CEO Tim Cook announced the series would be released in 2021. On 13 March 2020, Apple suspended filming on their shows due to the COVID-19 outbreak; filming resumed on October 6, 2020.

The Foundation TV series was filmed at Troy Studios, Limerick, Ireland, and the budget was expected to be approximately $50 million. The first episodes premiered on September 24, 2021. Metacritic gave the first season a weighted average score of 63 out of 100 based on 22 reviews, indicating "generally favorable reviews". The second season was released in 2023 and the third season was released in 2025.
