= Paul Maxwell =

Canadian actor (1921–1991)

- Maxwell in Randall and Hopkirk (Deceased); episode "The Trouble with Women" (1969)
- Born: Maxim Popovich; 12 November 1921; Winnipeg, Manitoba, Canada
- Died: 19 December 1991 (aged 70); London, England
- Occupation: Actor
- Years active: 1957–1991
- Spouse: Mary Lindsay (m. 1945)
- Children: 1

Paul Maxwell (born Maxim Popovich; 12 November 1921 – 19 December 1991) was a Canadian actor who worked mostly in British cinema and television, in which he was usually cast as American characters. In terms of audience, his most notable role was probably that of Steve Tanner, the ex-GI husband of Elsie Tanner in Coronation Street in 1967. Also, notable work he performed in was voicing Captain Grey in Captain Scarlet and the Mysterons, Colonel Steve Zodiac in Fireball XL5, acted as Elijah Baley in the Out of the Unknown episode "The Naked Sun", Lt. Jim Lewis in the UFO episode "Sub-Smash", Jim Gordon in audio drama Batman: The Lazarus Syndrome, and Van Leuwen in Aliens.

== Life and career ==
During World War II, Maxwell served in the Royal Canadian Artillery. He studied at Yale University and graduated with a Master of Fine Arts.

Maxwell started as an actor in the U.S., appearing in series such as Dragnet and Alfred Hitchcock Presents and then he emigrated to Britain in 1960. In the next decade, Maxwell appeared in many TV series produced by ITC Entertainment, such as Danger Man and The Baron. He also voiced North American characters in series filmed by Gerry Anderson's production company Century 21, most prominently the leading character of Colonel Steve Zodiac in Fireball XL5 (1962) and the supporting character of Captain Grey in Captain Scarlet and the Mysterons (1967). Maxwell also made several appearances in UFO (1970).

Maxwell also starred as the Man with the Panama Hat in Indiana Jones and the Last Crusade (1989), as a CIA director in The Pink Panther Strikes Again (1976), and as General Maxwell Taylor in A Bridge Too Far (1977). His also starred in the West End several times, with roles in Twelve Angry Men and the musical Promises, Promises.

Maxwell was married to Mary Lindsay and the couple had one daughter. He died of cancer in London in 1991 at age 70.

== Selected filmography ==
- 1957 Death in Snall Doctor as Doctor (uncredited)
- 1957 Blood of Dracula as Mike, Young Doctor
- 1958 Alfred Hitchcock Presents (Season 3 Episode 19: "The Equalizer") as Ed Sobel
- 1958 Alfred Hitchcock Presents]] (Season 3 Episode 23: "The Right Kind of House") as Detective Sergeant Singer
- 1958 Alfred Hitchcock Presents (Season 3 Episode 26: "Bull in a China Shop") as Lab Technician
- 1958 The True Story of Lynn Stuart as Customer (uncredited)
- 1958 How to Make a Monster as Jeffrey Clayton
- 1958 Submarine Seahawk as Lieutenant Commander Bill Hallohan, XO
- 1958-1959 Playhouse 90 as Cooley / Recorder
- 1959 Alfred Hitchcock Presents (Season 4 Episode 31: "Your Witness") as George the Police Officer
- 1959 Never So Few as Co-Pilot (uncredited)
- 1960 Alfred Hitchcock Presents (Season 5 Episode 18: "Backward, Turn Backward") as Saul
- 1960 Bells Are Ringing as Party Guest (uncredited)
- 1961 Freedom to Die as Craig Owen
- 1961 Sea Hunt ("The Destroyers") as Dr. Neal Martin
- 1962 We Joined the Navy as Commander Spelling, USN
- 1962 Fireball XL5 as Colonel Steve Zodiac
- 1963 Follow the Boys as C.M.A.A
- 1963 The Haunting as Bud Fredericks (uncredited)
- 1964 Shadow of Fear as Bill Martin
- 1964 Man in the Middle as Major Fred Smith
- 1965 Out of the Unknown as Elijah Baley in the episode The Naked Sun
- 1965 Up from the Beach as Corporal Evans
- 1965 City of Fear as Mike Foster
- 1966 La cieca di Sorrento as Unknown
- 1966 Thunderbirds as Captain Ashton and 2nd Reporter in the episode "Alias Mr. Hackenbacker"
- 1966 Thunderbirds Are GO as Captain Paul Travers
- 1967 The 25th Hour as Photographer
- 1967 It! as Jim Perkins
- 1967 The Man Outside as Judson Murphy
- 1967-1968 Captain Scarlet and the Mysterons as Captain Grey
- 1970 The Looking Glass War as CIA Man
- 1970 UFO as Lieutenant Jim Lewis in the episode Sub-Smash
- 1972 Madame Sin as Connors
- 1972 Ooh... You Are Awful as 1st US Tourist (voice only)
- 1973 Baxter! as Mr. Baxter
- 1974 Percy's Progress as UN Delegate (uncredited)
- 1976 The Pink Panther Strikes Again as CIA Director
- 1976 Spy Story as Submarine Captain
- 1977 A Bridge Too Far as Major General Maxwell Taylor
- 1980 Cry Wolf as Dr. Jack Russell
- 1983 Sahara as Chase
- 1985 Rustlers' Rhapsody as Sheepherder #1
- 1986 Aliens as Van Leuwen
- 1986 Strong Medicine as Mace
- 1989 Dirk Maggs produced audio drama: Batman: The Lazarus Syndrome as Jim Gordon (character)
- 1989 Indiana Jones and the Last Crusade as Panama Hat
