= R. Daneel Olivaw =

Fictional character from the Foundation Universe by Isaac Asimov

- Robot series character/ Foundation series character
- R. Daneel Olivaw as depicted on the cover of the novel The Naked Sun.
- First appearance: The Caves of Steel
- Last appearance: Foundation and Earth
- Created by: Isaac Asimov

In-universe information
- Species: Robot
- Gender: Male

R. Daneel Olivaw is a fictional robot created by Isaac Asimov. The "R" initial in his name stands for "Robot," a naming convention in Asimov's future society during Earth's early period of space colonization. Daneel is introduced in The Caves of Steel, a serialized story published in Galaxy Science Fiction from October to December 1953. The full story was published by Doubleday as a hardcover book in 1954.

In his introduction story, Daneel is said to be not only made in the likeness of one of his creators, but is also the first robot physically indistinguishable from humans. Like other robots in Asimov's stories, his "positronic brain" is governed by the Three Laws of Robotics. Daneel's particular brain and system are more advanced than the average robot. He can convincingly mimic human behavior and reactions, is better able to adapt and evolve through increased knowledge and experience, and can perform "cerebroanalysis", an ability defined as an "interpretation of the electromagnetic fields of living brain cells" that provides "information of the temperamental and emotional makeup of an individual." Asimov's concept of cerebroanalysis in 1953 predicted magnetic resonance imaging (first demonstrated in 1973), and also its later (and currently debated) use to determine truthfulness or deceit.

Daneel is one of the two protagonists of Asimov's Robot series books The Caves of Steel (1953), The Naked Sun (1956), and The Robots of Dawn (1983). In these books, he works with human detective Elijah Baley to solve unusual murders. Along with the murder mystery aspect, the stories focus on discussions regarding space exploration and human societal norms, and show an evolution in both the friendship developing between the two characters and Daneel's personal sense of morality. He and Elijah also appear in the short story "Mirror Image" (1972).

Daneel also appears in Robots and Empire (1985), a book that acts as a bridge between Asimov's Robot series and his Foundation series, the latter of which takes place during and after the age of the galaxy's First Empire. In the prequels and sequels to the original Foundation trilogy, a character is revealed to be Daneel now living under a different identity, meaning he has survived for thousands of years, living through the entire era of the First Empire and beyond. By this point, he has replaced much of his body with new hardware, though his mind still operates under the Three Laws of Robotics.

== Character biography ==
Daneel is a robot built by Roj Nemennuh Sarton and Han Fastolfe, who are Spacer roboticists from the planet Aurora, in the year 4920 AD. Although designed and built by Auroran roboticists, Daneel was constructed on Earth. He is the first humanoid, or "humaniform," robot ever constructed and is outwardly indistinguishable from a human being. This "undercover" attribute enables him to help New York City Police detective Elijah Baley solve crimes. Daneel and Baley first meet while Baley is investigating the murder of Daneel's co-creator Sarton in Spacetown. Daneel is physically a perfect likeness of Dr. Sarton.

Daneel has a broad, high-cheekboned face and short bronze hair lying flatly backward and without a parting. He wears clothes and, in The Caves of Steel, cannot be told apart from a human unless in a situation where he refuses to violate the Three Laws of Robotics, and even in this case is indistinguishable from a particularly altruistic person. In The Caves of Steel, Daneel reveals that he has the capability to perform cerebroanalysis enabling him to interpret the emotional makeup of human brain activity. In Robots and Empire, Daneel gains the ability to influence the mental state of other creatures, human or robot, and, presumably, animal. Daneel gains this ability as a result of voluntary acceptance of reprogramming instructions from R. Giskard Reventlov.

== Relationship with Elijah Baley ==
Daneel is introduced in the book The Caves of Steel, where he is tasked to assist Elijah Baley in the investigation of the murder of his creator, Roj Nemennuh Sarton. The book shows Earth's prejudice against robots, explaining why a humanoid robot was assigned to the case. Initially Baley is suspicious of Daneel and constructs two separate theories in which the Robot is responsible for the murder. The first supposition is that Daneel is in fact Sarton pretending to be a robot; the second supposition is that Daneel lacks the Three Laws. After both theories are disproven, Baley begins to feel a friendship with Daneel. At the same time, watching Baley gives Daneel a more nuanced view of justice, coming to understand that it is better to convert evil to good than to simply destroy evil.

Baley meets Daneel again in The Naked Sun, in which he is sent to the Spacer planet Solaria to investigate the murder of Rikaine Delmarre, the husband of Gladia Delmarre. The Solarians are not informed of Daneel's robotic nature, as a show of Aurora's superiority in the creation of robots. Daneel learns from Baley's methods of investigation in both books, which leads to him playing a larger role in The Naked Sun.

Daneel also solves a case with Baley in Asimov's short story "Mirror Image". This story was written due to popular fan demand for another Baley/Daneel story. After it was written, Asimov was told by some fans that they enjoyed it, but had hoped for another novel.

Baley and Daneel's last case together takes place on Aurora in the novel The Robots of Dawn. The murder victim is a humanoid robot, R. Jander Panell, who belonged to Gladia Delmarre and is physically similar to Daneel. Unknown to the public, Gladia and Jander had a sexual relationship and she secretly regarded the humanoid robot as her husband.

Baley's and Daneel's friendship grows with each novel, ultimately leading to Daneel being the first of only two robots to ever set foot on a Settler world, when Elijah Baley specifically asks to see him on his deathbed (R. Giskard being the second robot, many years later). Baley sends Daneel away immediately before dying, as witnessing his death would harm Daneel due to the First Law of Robotics. Baley's words to reassure Daneel about his death—explaining to him that he is a "mere thread in the vast tapestry of humanity"—assist Daneel in solidifying the Zeroth Law of Robotics.

Baley and the experiences Daneel had with him remain important to Daneel thousands of years later. When asked about Baley, deemed a mythic figure by then, Daneel states that he was greater than any myth claimed him to be.

== Zeroth Law of Robotics ==
In Robots and Empire, where Asimov links the Robot series with the Empire series, Giskard and Daneel often discuss the limitations of the Laws of Robotics, a process lengthened by the fact that their positronic pathways prevent thought along these lines, thus often leading to a temporary loss in the ability to talk or move. By the end of the book, when Daneel has formulated the Zeroth Law of Robotics ("A robot may not harm humanity, or through inaction, allow humanity to come to harm"), Giskard is the first robot to act according to this new law. However, the act of causing harm to a human being in violation of the First Law proves fatally destructive for Giskard, due to the uncertainty of whether or not his actions benefit humanity in the long run — he believes in the law, but is unable to point a finger at "humanity" as he could at an individual human, to assess the benefit or harm done. Before deactivating completely, Giskard is able to transfer his powers of being able to read and influence minds to Daneel (by describing the necessary circuits to be rewired in Daneel's brain). It is implied that Daneel's closer tie to humanity allows him to slowly adapt to the new law with far less risk of destruction.

== The Foundation series ==
Together Daneel and Giskard imagine the science of "psychohistory" or laws of humanics, that would enable them to execute the "Zeroth Law" in a quantitative sense. Thousands of years later this would be developed into practical application by mathematician Hari Seldon.

From that time onward, Daneel manipulates the galaxy with the help of his many robot allies. Hari Seldon's wife Dors Venabili is the only one of Daneel's humanoid robot allies to be shown in the books. He sets up both the Galactic Empire and Gaia in order to create a society that does not need robots. Under the guise of Eto Demerzel, he becomes the First Minister to galactic Emperor Stanel VI and Cleon I.

When Hari Seldon first comes to Trantor in Prelude to Foundation (1988), Daneel, under the guise of reporter Chetter Hummin (a play on the words "cheater" and "human"), convinces Hari that the Galactic Empire is dying and that psychohistory must be developed into a practical science in order to save it. As Hummin, he convinces Seldon that Cleon's first minister Eto Demerzel is pursuing him and that it is imperative for Hari to escape and to try making psychohistory practical. He introduces Hari to Dors Venabili, who becomes Hari's friend, protector, and future wife. At the end of Seldon's "Flight" it is revealed that Hummin and Demerzel are actually the same person, and are both false identities of Daneel. Demerzel appears again in Forward the Foundation (1993), first as the First Minister as he discusses with Seldon his progress and the Empire's future. Demerzel eventually steps down from his post and offers it to Seldon, and disappears. He later makes a brief appearance in the epilogue, which says he was one of the many in attendance at Hari Seldon's funeral.

Daneel appears once more in Foundation and Earth (1986), where Golan Trevize and Janov Pelorat from the Foundation eventually find the radioactive Earth and Daneel's base on the Moon and learn about his paternalistic manipulations, including the settlement of Alpha Centauri, the creation of Gaia, and psychohistory.

Based on an independent timeline, Daneel was 19,230 years old during the events of Foundation and Earth. Daneel is the longest-living Asimov character, as well as the longest living humanoid robot in that universe (being the first humanoid robot created). He is theoretically immortal, because he is a robot. However, his parts need replacing, including his brain, and he eventually has to use a biological brain, as his own becomes more complex each time he replaces it. Daneel mentions that the more complex his brains become, the more fragile they are. At the end of the book, he intends fusing his brain with that of a Solarian, as it has reached the point where an upgrade is no longer possible. Daneel's original brain had lasted 10,000 years, approximately half his lifetime. In contrast, his final brain, which was thousands of times more advanced than his first, showed signs of shutting down after only 600 years.

== Appearances in other media ==
- In the 1964 British television adaptation of The Caves of Steel (an episode of the BBC2 series Story Parade), Daneel was played by John Carson. The script was adapted by Terry Nation.
- In the 1969 British television adaptation of The Naked Sun (an episode of the BBC2 series Out of the Unknown), Daneel was played by David Collings.
- In the 1978 Soviet adaptation, The Last Alternative, Daneel was played by Georgiy Vasilyev.
- In the 1988 interactive film Robots, Daneel was portrayed by Brent Barrett.
- In the 1989 BBC Radio 4 adaptation of The Caves of Steel, Daneel was played by Sam Dastor.
- In the 2021 Apple TV+ adaptation of Foundation, Laura Birn portrays Demerzel, a gender-swapped version of the character. Asked about the Three Laws in the show, series executive producer David S. Goyer said that "They are important and they will be addressed." and that the "Laws exist in our show mythology and we will be talking about them explicitly." In an "ask me anything" open interview in August 2023, Goyer confirmed that they had acquired the rights to confirm Demerzel to be Daneel in the second season from FOX head Lachlan Murdoch, a self-professed "fan of the show", and that Asimov's three laws would be further expanded upon that season, further revealing that they had "discussed doing a spin-off mini-series [about Demerzel/Daneel] that specifically delves into our version of The Robot Wars".
