= Foundation and Earth =

1986 novel by Isaac Asimov

- First edition cover
- Author: Isaac Asimov
- Cover artist: Alan Wallerstein
- Language: English
- Series: Foundation series
- Genre: Science fiction
- Publisher: Doubleday
- Publication date: 1986-10-03
- Publication place: United States
- Media type: Print (Hardcover, Paperback)
- Pages: 356
- ISBN: 0-385-23312-4
- OCLC: 13123192
- Preceded by: Foundation's Edge

Foundation and Earth is a science fiction novel by American writer Isaac Asimov, the fifth novel of the Foundation series and chronologically the last in the series. It was published in 1986, four years after the first sequel to the Foundation trilogy, which is titled Foundation's Edge.

== Plot summary ==
=== Introduction ===
Several centuries after the events of Second Foundation, two citizens of the Foundation search for Earth, the legendary planet where humans are said to have originated.

=== Summary ===
Part I: Gaia. Councilman Golan Trevize, historian Janov Pelorat, and Bliss of the planet Gaia (introduced in Foundation's Edge) set out on a journey to find humanity's ancestral home planet—Earth. The purpose of the journey is to settle Trevize's doubt of his intuitive endorsement, at the end of Foundation's Edge, of the all-encompassing noosphere of Galaxia as the future of mankind.

Part II: Comporellon. First, they visit Comporellon, said to have legends concerning Earth according to Munn Li Compor, which claims to be the oldest currently inhabited planet in the galaxy. Upon arrival, they are imprisoned, but negotiate their way out. While there, a historian gives them the coordinates of three Spacer planets, surmised to be fairly close to Earth. One is Aurora, a desolate, lifeless planet. The second is Solaria, a planet with merely 1500 people on it.

Part III: Aurora. The first Spacer planet they visit is Aurora, which was abandoned by its inhabitants and has a collapsing ecology. Trevize is nearly killed by a pack of wild dogs, presumed to be the descendants of household pets reverted to wolf-like savagery. They escape when Bliss manipulates the dogs' emotions to psychologically compel a retreat, amplifying the fear induced by cries from one of the dogs that Trevize used his neuronic whip on.

Part IV: Solaria. Next, they visit Solaria, where they find that the Solarians, who have survived the Spacer-Settler conflicts by clever retreat detailed in Asimov's novel Robots and Empire, have genetically engineered themselves into self-reproducing hermaphrodites, generally intolerant of human physical presence or contact. They have also given themselves the ability to mentally channel ("transduce") great amounts of energy obtained from their vast estates via a modification to the brain, and use this as their sole source of power. The Solarians avoid ever having to interact with each other, except by holographic apparatus ("viewing"), and reproduce only when necessary to replace the dead. Bliss, Pelorat, and Trevize are nearly killed by the Solarian Sarton Bander, as the penalty is death for simply landing on the planet, but Bliss deflects the transduction at the moment Bander uses it as a weapon, accidentally killing Bander. While escaping, they stumble upon Bander's young child, Fallom, and with Fallom's help, reach the surface from Bander's underground mansion. Bliss, by preference, uses the feminine pronoun for Fallom. They take the child with them, as the Solarians would execute her — she would be surplus to their population requirements, and a more mature child from another estate would be chosen to take over Bander's estate.

Part V: Melpomenia. The crew now visit Melpomenia, the third and final Spacer coordinate they have, where the atmosphere has become reduced to a few thousandths of normal atmospheric pressure. Wearing space suits, they enter a library, and find a plaque listing the names and coordinates of all fifty Spacer worlds. On the way back to the ship, they notice a moss has begun to grow around the seals of their space suits, and just in time, surmise that the moss is feeding on minuscule leakages of carbon dioxide. Thus, they are able to eradicate the moss with a blaster and heavy UV-illumination so that no spores are unintentionally carried off the planet. They then plot the Spacer worlds, which form a rough sphere, on the ship's map and conclude that the location of Earth must be near to the center of the sphere. This area turns out to have a binary star system.

Part VI: Alpha. They arrive at the planet Alpha, which orbits Alpha Centauri and is all ocean except for an island 250 kilometres (160 mi) long and 65 kilometres (40 mi) wide on which live a small group of humans. In a reference to the radioactive Earth of Asimov's novel Pebble in the Sky, the restoration of Earth's soil was eventually abandoned in favour of resettling the population to "New Earth", which the First Galactic Empire had already been terraforming. The natives appear friendly, but secretly they intend to kill the visitors with a microbiological agent to prevent them from informing the rest of the galaxy of their existence. They are warned to escape before the agent can be activated by a native woman who has formed an attraction to Trevize and was impressed by Fallom's ability to play a flute with just her mind. Now certain that Alpha Centauri is not Earth but near it, they approach a system close by and are puzzled by the very strong similarities between this star and the larger sun of the Alpha Centauri system. Asimov here is making use of an astronomical curiosity: the nearest star system to Sol contains a star that has the same spectral type, G2 V, though Alpha Centauri A is a little larger and brighter.

Part VII: Earth. On the approach to Earth, they detect it to be highly radioactive and not capable of supporting life but, while trying to use the ship's computer to locate Solaria, Fallom calls Trevize's attention to the moon, which is large enough to serve as a hideout for the forces that lived on Earth. There, they find R. Daneel Olivaw, who explains he has been paternalistically manipulating humanity since Elijah Baley's time, long before the Galactic Empire or Foundation. He thus caused the settlement of Alpha Centauri, the creation of Gaia and the creation of psychohistory (detailed in Prelude to Foundation and Forward the Foundation), and manipulated Trevize into making his decision at the end of Foundation's Edge (although he did not manipulate the decision itself). It is revealed that Daneel's positronic brain is deteriorating and he is unable to design a new brain, as he had done several times before, since his brain is now too fragile; he therefore wishes to merge Fallom's mind with his own, allowing him time to oversee Galaxia's creation.

Daneel continues to explain that human internal warfare or parochialism was the reason for his causing the creation of psychohistory and Gaia. Trevize then confirms his decision that the creation of Galaxia is the correct choice, and gives his reason as the likelihood of advanced life beyond the galaxy eventually attacking humanity. Trevize states that there should be enough time for Galaxia to be fully ready as long as the enemy is not already present among them, while uncomfortably noticing Fallom's alien gaze resting unfathomably upon him.

== Reception ==
Foundation and Earth was reviewed extensively at the time of its publication, including in foreign language venues, reviews which included the attention of Dan Chow, Gene DeWeese, Elton T. Elliott, Don D'Ammassa, Donald M. Hassler, Jon Wallace, Darrell Schweitzer, Everett F. Bleiler, Thomas A. Easton, John Newsinger, and Doug Fratz (and in French and Portuguese, respectively, by Jonathan Dornet and Roberto de Sousa Causo).

David Langford also reviewed Foundation and Earth; he stated that "Whopping concepts and evocative descriptions boost the novel half-way to excellence, but are defeated by the dead-weight of the stereotypes and lecturing. Hard SF fans will forgive its flaws."

== Awards and recognition ==
Foundation and Earth appeared in fifth place on the 1987 Locus Award list for Best SF Novel, preceded, among others, by Orson Scott Card's Speaker for the Dead, William Gibson's Count Zero, and Margaret Atwood's The Handmaid's Tale.
