= Robots (1988 film) =

1988 interactive movie

Robots is a 1988 Interactive movie directed by Doug Smith and Kim Takal. Its screenplay, by Peter Olatka, is based on Isaac Asimov's Robot series. It stars Stephen Rowe as Elijah Baley, Brent Barrett as R. Daneel Olivaw, and John Henry Cox as Han Fastolfe.

== Plot ==
Elijah Baley is issued an assignment by Police Commissioner Julius Enderby to induct a Spacer Robot onto the force, as requested by Dr. Han Fastolfe, the galaxy's leading Spacer roboticist. Baley meets R. Daneel Olivaw at Spacertown, where they discover that Han Fastolfe becomes the victim of a failed murder attempt, his life saved thanks to his robot assistant R. Giskard. Kelden Amadiro, seemingly enraged by the attack on Fastolfe, quickly blames Earth. Using the riots against Spacers and Robots as an excuse, Amadiro issues an ultimatum to Enderby: Find Fastolfe's assailant in 24 hours or Spacer Robots will enter the City to put down the riots.

Throughout the video, Elijah Baley addresses Data Central (the viewers) where he "submits" evidence in the form of a clue card. The viewers are prompted to draw one of the cards with one side facing up while taking note of everything that happens in the story. Along the way, he interviews Sophia Quintana- Earth's leading roboticist, rivaled (and romantically rejected) by Fastolfe himself-, Vasilia Fastolfe- Han's estranged daughter, who bears a grudge towards Han for stealing credit for her works, and harbors an overt distaste for Earthmen (Baley most notably)-, and finally Amadiro, who is a political rival of Fastolfe, the former of whom is known for his anti-Earth views.

Daneel objects since Spacers have no crime and Vasilia is Han's daughter, but Baley argues that they've become unstable enough by the stress of being on Earth. Daneel then adds to the list Julius Enderby who, being a medievalist and under pressure to control the riots, also had clear motive. Elijah agrees, but also adds Borgraf, Jane and Sammy, which Daneel objects because of the First Law of Robotics: "A Robot may not injure a human or, through inaction, allow a human to come to harm."

Upon returning to Spacertown, Baley reveals that the Han Fastolfe in the lab is actually a humanoid robot sent by the real Han Fastolfe (who is still on Aurora) in anticipation of his ongoing political struggles with Amadiro and Vasilia, and out of an overriding fear of Earth germs (which was at odds with Robot Fastolfe's more hospitable behavior). This revelation validates the presence of robots on the suspect list by rendering the Three Laws of Robotics moot. At the last moment of Amadiro's ultimatum, Daneel comes through with the last bit of evidence. Baley accepts it and shakes Daneel's hand, ending his hostility with the humanoid robot.

The video ends on a cliffhanger, with Baley prompting the viewers to use the clues they've gathered from the cards and the video to identify the suspect, spell out their motive and describe the opportunity they had to commit the crime.

== Cast of characters (by appearance) ==
- Newscaster – Valarie Pettiford
- Julius Enderby – Larry Block
- Elijah "Lige" Baley – Stephen Rowe
- R. Sammy – Richard Levine
- R. Daneel Olivaw – Brent Barrett
- Han Fastolfe – John Henry Cox
- R. Giskard / R. Borgraf – Eric Tull
- Kelden Amadiro – George Merritt
- Sophia Quintana – Darrie Lawrence
- R. Jane – Debra Jo Rupp
- Vasilia Fastolfe – Eleni Kelakos
