= Brent Barrett =

American actor & tenor (born 1957)

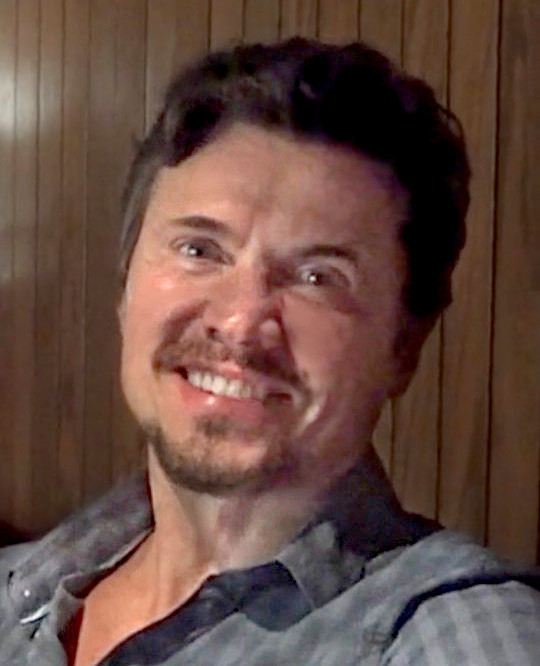
- Born: February 28, 1957 (age 68); Quinter, Kansas, United States
- Occupations: Actor, tenor
- Years active: 1980–present
- Website: www.brentbarrett.com

Brent Barrett (born February 28, 1957) is an American actor and tenor who is mostly known for his work within American theatre. Barrett has performed in musicals and in concerts with theatres, symphony orchestras, opera houses, and concert halls internationally. He starred in the original production of Maltby and Shire's hit Off-Broadway musical Closer Than Ever in 1989 and the 2001 West End revival of Cole Porter's Kiss Me, Kate. He has also appeared sporadically on television and in films.

== Early life and career ==
Barrett was born and raised in Quinter, Kansas, the youngest of three children.

He began his education at Fort Hays State University in 1974 as a vocal performance major but ultimately transferred to Carnegie Mellon University in 1976 where he studied musical theatre. While still a student he began his professional career performing with the Pittsburgh Civic Light Opera during the 1978 and 1979 seasons, appearing in productions of Half a Sixpence, Camelot, Good News, The Red Mill, Cabaret, and Funny Girl among others. While in his final year in college, he was cast by Jerome Robbins to play Diesel in the 1980 Broadway revival of Leonard Bernstein's West Side Story. He finished his degree that year and went to Broadway to begin his long association with New York theatre. He ultimately took over the role of Tony for the last three months of the show's run.

In 1981, Barrett played Whizzer in the Off-Broadway production of March of the Falsettos, taking over the role when the production moved to the Westside Arts Theater. In 1982 he portrayed the title role in the Off-Broadway production of Des McAnuff's The Death of Von Richthofen as Witnessed From Earth at the Joseph Papp Public Theater and he starred in Howard Marren's Portrait of Jennie at the Henry Street Settlement's New Federal Theater. He returned to Broadway in 1983 as Charles Castleton in the ill-fated Alan Jay Lerner musical Dance a Little Closer. That same year he was cast in the recurring role of Tony Barclay on the soap opera All My Children, appearing in several episodes through 1984.

In 1985 Barrett portrayed the role of Lieutenant Cable in the National Tour of Rodgers and Hammerstein's South Pacific. In 1986 he appeared as Eddie Yeager in the Off-Broadway revival of Arthur Laurents's The Time of the Cuckoo at the York Theatre at St. Peter's. In 1988 he portrayed the role of R. Daneel Olivaw in Robots, a television film adaptation of Isaac Asimov's Robot series. In 1989 he appeared in the original production of Richard Maltby, Jr. and David Shire's Closer Than Ever at the Cherry Lane Theatre. A critical success, the show ran for 312 performances and a CD recording was made on the RCA Victor label.

== Later life and career ==
Barrett had a small role in the 1990 film Longtime Companion. In May of that same year he joined the original Broadway cast of Grand Hotel, replacing the ailing David Carroll as Baron Felix Von Gaigern. This replacement—only six months into the show's run—resulted in Barrett playing the Baron during the 44th Tony Awards telecast, despite the fact that Carroll was nominated for the part. Delays in recording the Grand Hotel score led to Barrett also being featured on the show's cast album. Barrett went on to reprise the Baron role for the original West End production of Grand Hotel in 1992, as well as portray the Baron during the show's international tour.

In 1993 he toured the United States as Frank Butler in Irving Berlin's Annie Get Your Gun, with Cathy Rigby as Annie. In 1994 he appeared as Victor Duchesi in the original production of the Sherman Brothers's Busker Alley, which through unhappy circumstance never made it to Broadway, although it had been scheduled to do so. In 1996 he played the role of Uris in the Hercules: The Legendary Journeys's episode A Star to Guide Them. That same year he appeared as Tommy Albright in the New York City Opera's production of Brigadoon with Rebecca Luker as Fiona, and he played the role of Archibald in Lucy Simon's The Secret Garden in cities throughout New Zealand.

He returned to Broadway in 1997 to portray Maximilian in the revival of Bernstein's Candide. In 1998 he played the role of Billy Flynn in the National Tour of Chicago for which he won a Los Angeles Drama Critics Circle Award, and the following year he took on the same role in the Broadway revival for several months.

In 2000 Barrett portrayed Edward Moncrief in the New York City Center Encores! revival of On a Clear Day You Can See Forever with Kristin Chenoweth as Daisy Gamble. He returned to Broadway again in the winter of 2001 to replace Patrick Cassidy as Frank Butler in the revival of Irving Berlin's Annie Get Your Gun, portraying the role opposite Reba McEntire as Annie. The Fall of that same year he was cast in the starring role of Fred Graham for the West End revival of Cole Porter's Kiss Me, Kate, which also starred Marin Mazzie and later Rachel York as Lilli Vanessi. For his performance he received a Laurence Olivier Awards nomination. The production was recorded live for broadcast on PBS's Great Performances in the United States and is available on DVD.

In 2002 he portrayed the role of Sid Sorokin in the City Center Encores! revival of The Pajama Game and he played the role of Billy Crocker in Anything Goes at UCLA's Freud Playhouse in Westwood, Los Angeles, California. On New Years Day 2003 he appeared in a concert of music by Kurt Weill with the Berlin Philharmonic under conductor Simon Rattle. That same year he portrayed Arthur in Lerner and Loewe's Camelot at the Paper Mill Playhouse in Millburn, New Jersey and he returned to Broadway to portray Billy Flynn in the revival of Chicago, leaving the production in 2004.

In 2005 Barrett appeared as Brian The Set Designer in the film version of The Producers. That same year he returned to Broadway to play the role of Billy Flynn again in the revival of Chicago and he sang at the New York Festival of Song at Carnegie Hall in a concert honoring Hal Prince. In 2006 he played the title role in Andrew Lloyd Webber's The Phantom of the Opera for the new production in at The Venetian Resort in Las Vegas which was directed by Hal Prince.

On July 7, 2009, he rejoined the Broadway cast of Chicago, in the role of Billy Flynn, a role he has now played in several engagements on Broadway. He starred alongside Samantha Harris from television's Dancing with the Stars in the role of Roxie.

Barrett rejoined the cast of Chicago from February 7 to March 7, 2011, to be replaced by Christopher Sieber temporarily, to then take over again from March 26 to June 19, 2011. During this return, he starred opposite Christie Brinkley in her Broadway debut.

On June 24, 2011, five days after leaving Chicago, Barrett began starring as famous character Hannibal Lecter, in SILENCE! The Musical, described as an "unauthorized parody" of The Silence of the Lambs. The show ran longer than its initial limited engagement at 80 St. Marks Place, directed and choreographed by Christopher Gattelli. Barrett can also be heard on the Original Cast Recording.

Barrett starred as Captain Hook in the American tour of Peter Pan opposite Cathy Rigby with whom he had previously starred in Annie Get Your Gun.

It was announced he would reprise the titular role in the Oberhausen production of The Phantom of the Opera in November 2015, with Elizabeth Welch from the New York production playing Christine. His run was postponed to early 2016 due to an injury he sustained during rehearsals.

In June and July 2016, Barrett played Georges in a production of La Cage aux Folles at the Signature Theatre in Arlington, Virginia.

In June 2018 Barrett joined the cast of Cocktail Cabaret at Caesar's Palace for a limited engagement.

== Personal life ==
Barrett lives in Las Vegas with his husband, Bernie Blanks.

== Discography ==
Barrett has appeared on several recordings, including theatrical cast recordings and compilations.

- Silence! The Musical: Original Cast Recording
- Christmas Mornings
- Brent Barrett: The Alan Jay Lerner Album
- Brent Barrett: The Kander and Ebb Album
- The Maury Yeston Songbook
- Sondheim: The Stephen Sondheim Album
- Wonderful Town: 1999 Studio Album
- Lost in Boston IV
- Unsung Musicals III
- Candide: The New Broadway Cast Recording
- The Busby Berkeley Album
- Broadway Showstoppers
- Grand Hotel: 1992 Broadway Cast Album
- Brigadoon: 1991 New York City Opera Recording
- Strike Up the Band: 1991 Studio Recording
- Closer Than Ever: Original Cast Recording

== Videography ==
- Kiss Me, Kate: London Cast

== Awards and nominations ==
Year	Award	Category	Series	Result
	2011 BroadwayWorld Chicago Awards	Best Actor	Follies as Ben	Winner
	Los Angeles Drama Critics Circle Awards	Best Actor	Chicago as Billy Flynn	Winner
	Olivier Awards	Best Actor for Fred/Petruchio (London)	Kiss Me, Kate	Nominated
(Source: )
