= Elijah Baley =

Elijah "Lije" Baley
- Robot series character
- Elijah Baley from a cover of The Caves of Steel
- First appearance: The Caves of Steel
- Last appearance: Robots and Empire
- Created by: Isaac Asimov
- Portrayed by: Peter Cushing (BBC TV 1962); Paul Maxwell (BBC TV 1969); Stephen Rowe (1988 interactive movie); Ed Bishop (BBC Radio 4)

In-universe information
- Species: Human
- Gender: Male
- Occupation: NYPD Homicide Detective
- Spouse: Jezebel
- Children: Bentley (son)
- Nationality: American

Elijah "Lije" Baley is a fictional character in Isaac Asimov's Robot series. He is the main character of the novels The Caves of Steel, The Naked Sun and The Robots of Dawn, and of the short story "Mirror Image." He is seen in flashbacks several times and talked about frequently in Robots and Empire, which is set roughly 160 years after his death. He is further mentioned in passing in "Foundation and Earth" as a "Culture Hero". Besides Asimov's works he appears in the Foundation's Friends story "Strip-Runner" by Pamela Sargent, and "Isaac Asimov's 'The Caves of Steel'" poem by Randall Garrett.

== Biography ==
Elijah Baley is a plainclothesman, a homicide detective in the New York City Police Department 3,000 years in the future. He is a doleful character with a quick temper. Like Sherlock Holmes, he is a pipe-smoker, a habit he fights against in The Robots of Dawn. He has a strong sense of duty and loyalty and is very protective of his family and his status. His wife is Jezebel "Jessie" Baley (née Navodny). Their son, Bentley, became a leader in the second wave of interplanetary space exploration.

Baley, like most earth-born human beings of his century, is strongly agoraphobic, as The Caves of Steel reveals that most natives of Earth live their entire lives in immense domed cities ("caves of steel") and rarely, if ever, travel to the outside surface. Baley's agoraphobia is an important personality characteristic and plot point in several of the novels in which he appears. In the later stories he has limited success in overcoming his agoraphobia, which he recognizes as a potential limitation to his species and more directly his son. (Baley's agoraphobia mirrors Asimov's own personality, who was a well known claustrophile.)

Asimov's novels are typically devoid of profanity. Consequently, Baley's favourite expletive is "Jehoshaphat!", which he says in times of great stress or excitement.

In The Caves of Steel, he is called upon to help solve the murder of a Spacer. The Spacers assign him a robot partner, R. Daneel Olivaw, who becomes his lifelong friend. He meets up with R. Daneel again in The Naked Sun, where again he is asked to investigate the murder of a Spacer, this time on the planet Solaria, making him the first Earthman to leave Earth since the first wave of colonization. Later, in the Robots of Dawn, while investigating another murder on behalf of the Spacers he recognizes R. Giskard's telepathic abilities long before anyone else does. Giskard modifies Baley's mind to prevent him from being able to tell anyone. While off Earth he develops a somewhat romantic and sexual relation with Gladia, a Spacer woman who, prompted by meeting him, becomes the first Solarian in centuries to willingly leave Solaria and the last to do so.

In "Robots and Empire" he is seen in a number of flashbacks, in particular over the course of the novel, Giskard, Gladia and finally Daneel all recall the last time they ever met him. Daneel's memory is notable as it covers an extremely elderly Baley bestowing his last words upon Daneel and reveals he perished mere moments after Daneel left his presence (at Baley's request, to prevent the sight of his death from distressing the Three Laws-compliant Daneel). His words have a profound impact on Daneel's behavior even many thousands of years on.

Some details of Baley's life lack continuity throughout the Robot novels. In The Caves of Steel, for example, it is noted that Baley's mother died shortly after his father was declassified (lost his civil classification and therefore all social and economic status), and that Baley did not remember her. However, in The Robots of Dawn, Baley recalls his mother cajoling him to eat her chicken soup and telling him that even the Spacers did not have anything as good. In The Caves of Steel, Baley is also reported to have a sister, but she is never referred to again. In the same way, Baley's intense shame at his father's declassification and the resulting deprivations of his childhood are not referred to in succeeding novels.

In later stories, it is revealed that Baley becomes a legendary hero for millennia. References to him can be found in Prelude to Foundation and Foundation and Earth.

== List of appearances ==
Novels:

- The Caves of Steel (1953)
- The Naked Sun (1955)
- The Robots of Dawn (1983)
- Robots and Empire (1985) (Baley only appears via flashbacks as he is deceased in the timeline of the main plot, although he still plays an important part in the story.)

Short story:

- Mirror Image (1972)

By other authors:

- Strip-Runner (Short story written by Pamela Sargent as part of the 1989 Asimov themed short story anthology Foundation's Friends)

== Portrayals ==
In the 1964 British television adaptation of The Caves of Steel (an episode of the BBC2 series Story Parade), Baley was played by Peter Cushing. The script was adapted by Terry Nation.

In the 1969 British television adaptation of The Naked Sun (an episode of the BBC2 series Out of the Unknown), Baley was played by Paul Maxwell.

In the 1988 interactive movie Robots, Baley was played by Stephen Rowe.

In the 1989 BBC Radio 4 adaptation of The Caves of Steel, Baley was played by Ed Bishop.
