= Robots and Empire =

Science fiction novel by the American author Isaac Asimov

- Cover of first edition (hardcover)
- Author: Isaac Asimov
- Cover artist: Barclay Shaw
- Language: English
- Series: Robot series
- Genre: Science fiction
- Publisher: Doubleday Books
- Publication date: 20 September 1985
- Publication place: United States
- Media type: Print (hardback & paperback)
- Pages: 383
- ISBN: 0-385-19092-1
- OCLC: 11728404
- Dewey Decimal: 813/.54 19
- LC Class: PS3551.S5 R64 1985
- Preceded by: The Robots of Dawn
- Followed by: The Stars, Like Dust

Robots and Empire is a science fiction novel by the American author Isaac Asimov, published by Doubleday Books in 1985. Robots and Empire is part of Asimov's consolidation of his three major series of science fiction stories and novels into a single future history: his Robot series, his Galactic Empire series and his Foundation series. (Asimov also carried out this unification in Foundation's Edge and its sequel.)

In the novel, Asimov depicts the transition from his earlier Milky Way Galaxy, inhabited by both human beings and positronic robots, to his Galactic Empire. The galaxy of his earlier trilogy of Robot novels is dominated by the blended human/robotic societies of the fifty "Spacer" planets, dispersed through the near-Earth part of the Galaxy. While the Earth is much more populous than all of the Spacer planets combined, its people are looked down upon and treated almost as sub-human by the Spacers. For a long time, the Spacers have forbidden immigration of people from the Earth. But Asimov's later Galactic Empire is populated by many quadrillions of human beings on hundreds of thousands of habitable planets and by very few robots (such as R. Daneel Olivaw). Even the technology to maintain and upgrade robots exists on only a few out-of-the-way planets. Therefore, this novel attempts to describe how his earlier Robot series ultimately connects to his Galactic Empire series.

== Plot summary ==
The Earthman Elijah Baley (the detective hero of the previous Robot books) has died nearly two centuries earlier. During these two centuries, Earth-people have overcome their agoraphobia and resumed space colonization, using faster-than-light drive to reach distant planets beyond the earlier "Spacer" worlds. Their inhabitants, calling themselves "Settlers" rather than "Spacers", revere Earth as their mother-world.

Baley's memory remains in the mind of his former lover, Gladia Delmarre, a long-lived "Spacer" who uncharacteristically relocated from the spacer world of Solaria to Aurora. Gladia's homeworld and the 50th-established of the Spacer planets, Solaria, has become empty of all human inhabitants, although millions of robot servants remain. A seventh-generation descendant of Baley's, Daneel Giskard ('D.G.') Baley, gains Gladia's help in visiting Solaria, to investigate the destruction of several "Settler" spaceships that made landings there and to capture the presumably unsupervised robots. Gladia is accompanied by the positronic robots R Daneel Olivaw and R Giskard Reventlov, both the former property of their creator, Dr Han Fastolfe, who bequeathed them to Gladia in his will. R Giskard has secret telepathic powers of which only R Daneel knows.

At the same time, Daneel and Giskard are engaged in a struggle of wits with Fastolfe's rivals: The roboticists Kelden Amadiro and Vasilia Aliena, Fastolfe's estranged daughter. Frustrated by his series of failures, Amadiro accepts an ambitious and unscrupulous apprentice, Levular Mandamus, who plans to destroy the population of the Earth by a newly developed weapon, the "nuclear intensifier", with which to accelerate the natural radioactive decay in the upper crust of the Earth, thereby making the surface of the Earth radioactive. R Daneel and R Giskard discover the roboticists' plan and attempt to stop Amadiro; but are hampered by the First Law of Robotics,

A robot may not injure a human being, or through inaction, allow a human being to come to harm.

which prevents them from a direct attack on Amadiro. Daneel and Giskard, meanwhile, have inferred an additional Zeroth Law of Robotics:

A robot may not injure humanity, or through inaction, allow humanity to come to harm.

It might enable them to overcome Amadiro, if they can use their telepathic perception of humanity to quell the inhibitions of the first law. When Vasilia accuses Giskard of telepathy (earlier created by herself), Giskard is compelled to manipulate her mind to make her forget about his telepathic powers. The two robots locate Amadiro and Mandamus on Earth, at the site of Three Mile Island Nuclear Generating Station in Pennsylvania. After Amadiro admits their plans, Giskard alters Amadiro's brain (using the newly created Zeroth Law); but in so doing, threatens his own.

Now alone with the robots, Mandamus claims that his intentions were to draw out the radioactive catastrophe over many decades, rather than the mere years that Amadiro wanted, and Giskard, believing it best for humanity to abandon the Earth, allows Mandamus to do this (resulting in the situation depicted in Pebble in the Sky), and deprives Mandamus of the memory of doing so. Giskard predicts, correctly, that by forcing humanity into leaving the Earth, vigor will be reintroduced into humankind and the new Settlers will populate space until all the governments of the interstellar colonies form a "Galactic Empire". Under the stress of having violated the First Law (in accordance with the Zeroth Law, but with the predicted benefit to humanity being uncertain), R Giskard himself suffers a soon-fatal malfunction of his positronic brain, but manages to confer his telepathic ability upon R Daneel.

== Novel ==
In his memoir I. Asimov (1994), Asimov explained that following his commercial and critical success with The Robots of Dawn, he decided to write Robots and Empire with the intentions of making Daneel, "the real hero of the series", the novel's protagonist, and that Robots and Empire would create a bridge to the later volumes of his future history. About this second aim, Asimov said that he was dissuaded by Lester del Rey and Judy-Lynn del Rey, his long-time friends and the editors of Del Rey Books, who thought that the fans of Asimov's series of novels would rather that Asimov kept the Robot and Empire/Foundation universes separate. On the other hand, his editors at Doubleday, his hardcover book publisher, encouraged Asimov to do what deep down he wanted to do. From then on, Asimov proceeded with his plans for unifying the two series.

Asimov organized Robots and Empire nonlinearly. (Other examples of nonlinear plotting in Asimov's novels can be found in The Gods Themselves and Nemesis.) Flashbacks by the major characters alternate with the present-time storyline. The story starts on the Spacer planet Aurora, where the heart of Amadiro's conspiracy against Settler civilization is developing. Meanwhile, aboard a starship, Gladia, Daneel, and Giskard visit the planets Solaria and Baleyworld before reaching the Earth, where this novel's climax takes place.

Asimov used a planet-hopping itinerary in most of the volumes of the Foundation series from Foundation and Empire onward. Unlike the detective fiction methods of the previous Robot novels, where Baley assembles the clues to a crime that had been committed, in Robots and Empire a murderous conspiracy developing against the Earth, and its discovery by the robots, keep pace with each other right up through the final confrontation with Amadiro on the Earth. Then, the robots have only moments to spare in terminating Amadiro's plan for a quick death to all Earthlings.

As well as linking the two series into a single future history, the present book served to address a criticism levelled against the largely radioactive Earth depicted in Pebble in the Sky and mentioned in several other books. Though not explicitly stated, there was the clear implication that the world's being mostly radioactive with humans precariously surviving in limited uncontaminated areas was the result of a nuclear war hundreds or thousands of years before the time of the plot. This would have made Pebble in the Sky part of the post-nuclear war subgenre common in the 1950s. It was, however, pointed out by critics that such an extensive use of nuclear weapons as to leave persistent and widespread radiation even after centuries would have completely destroyed all life on Earth at the moment when it took place. Therefore, in the present book Asimov provided a different origin for the future Earth's radioactivity.

== Reception ==
David Langford reviewed Robots and Empire for White Dwarf #85, and stated that "Asimov always perks up when chopping logic with the Three Laws of Robotics, and here his robots come up with a Fourth, or rather Zeroth, Law. This works out approximately as 'the end justifies the means'. For some reason the author doesn't even seem mildly worried by the implications..."
