= Ruth Ray =

American painter (1919–1977)

- Born: November 8, 1919; New York City, New York
- Died: December 18, 1977 (aged 58); Darien, Connecticut
- Education: Art Students League of New York
- Known for: painting
- Movement: Magic Realism

Ruth Ray (1919–1977) was an American painter in the Magic Realism style. Educated at the Pennsylvania Academy of the Fine Arts and the Art Students League of New York, she drew inspiration from the horses and farm life of New England.

== Biography ==
Ruth Ray was born in 1919 into a sophisticated New York City household. Her mother was an early feminist, a managing editor of Vogue, and a prolific author of self-help books. Ray attended Swarthmore College, Barnard College, the Pennsylvania Academy of the Fine Arts, and the Art Students League of New York. In 1948, she married and established a home in Darien, Connecticut. She had a successful career as a commercial artist and portraitist; among her most famous portraits was the golfer Sam Snead. However, her passion was an idiosyncratic form of Magic realism inspired by her love of horses, New England farm life, and the Maine seacoast.

== Works ==
Inspired by the surrealists but demonstrating a cultivated sense of restraint in the depiction of her subject matter, Ray juxtaposed the ordinary with the fantastical. "Her art might be called a rational surrealism," opined the critic Frederic Whitaker in 1957. "Some of her paintings suggest the skill of a Dalí with his irritating shock elements omitted." Ray's paintings are in the collections of several museums, including the National Art Museum of Sport, the National Academy of Design, and the Sheldon Museum of Art. Her "Swordsplay" (1962) numbers among the illustrations in "The Personality of the Horse." In her 2012-2013 exhibition, "Her Own Style: An Artist's Eye," curator Judith Shea selected Ray's "Self-Portrait" (1962) as one of thirty-three female artists' self-portraits from among the collection of the National Academy Museum.

Among her various awards, Ray received the Alger Prize in 1944 for "Portrait of a Young Actor" and the American Artist Magazine Medal of Honor in 1956. The Canadian poet Diana Hayes published a poem dedicated to Ruth Ray titled "Awakening" in Labyrinth of Green (Oakville, Ontario: Plumleaf Press, 2019).
