= The Naked Sun =

1956 novel by Isaac Asimov

- Dust-jacket of the first edition
- Author: Isaac Asimov
- Cover artist: Ruth Ray
- Language: English
- Series: Robot series
- Genre: Science fiction, mystery
- Publisher: Doubleday
- Publication date: 1956 (magazine), January 1957 (book)
- Publication place: United States
- Media type: Print (hardback & paperback)
- Pages: 187
- Preceded by: The Caves of Steel
- Followed by: The Robots of Dawn, "Mirror Image"

The Naked Sun is a science fiction novel by American writer Isaac Asimov, the second in his Robot series. Like its predecessor, The Caves of Steel, this is a whodunit story. It was first published in book form in 1957 after being serialized in Astounding Science Fiction between October and December 1956.

== Plot ==
The story arises from the murder of Rikaine Delmarre, a prominent "fetologist" (fetal scientist), responsible for the operation of the planetary birthing center of Solaria, a planet politically hostile to Earth, whose death Elijah Baley is called to investigate, at the request of the Solarian government. He is again partnered with the humanoid robot R. Daneel Olivaw, and asked by Earth's government to assess the Solarian society for weaknesses.

The book focuses on the unusual traditions, customs, and culture of Solarian society. The planet has a rigidly controlled population of 20,000, and all work is done by robots, which outnumber humans twenty thousand to one.

Normally the prime suspect in a murder would have been Delmarre's wife Gladia, who was present in the house when he was killed by being beaten over the head. She claims to have no memory of what happened, nor is there any sign of the object used to beat Rikaine Delmarre to death. The only witness is a malfunctioning house robot that has suffered damage to its positronic brain because it allowed harm to be done to a human, in violation of the First Law of robotics.

Baley's first encounter with Gladia is through "viewing" (holography), at which point he discovers that Solarians have no taboo about nudity when viewing, though Baley is shocked. Thereafter he develops a relationship with Gladia in face-to-face contact. She reveals to Baley that she does not like all the customs of Solaria, where face-to-face interaction, and especially sex, are considered repugnant, and was on bad terms with Rikaine, partly from sexual frustration.

The situation becomes more complex when Hannis Gruer, the Head of Security on Solaria, is poisoned while viewing with Baley. Baley, unable to intervene physically, has to call on Gruer's robots to save him. Baley is able to prevent the house robots from cleaning up the scene and destroying evidence, which happened after Delmarre's death.

Ultimately, it is revealed that Delmarre's neighbor, roboticist Jothan Leebig, was working on putting positronic brains in spaceships. This would negate the First Law, as such ships would not recognize that humans usually inhabit ships, and would therefore be able to attack and destroy other ships without regard for their crews. Delmarre was one of his opponents, as were other Solarians who were horrified by the prospect of robots that could actually harm humans. Leebig poisoned Gruer by tricking his robots, using his knowledge of positronic brains, into putting poison into Gruer's drink. Daneel goes to arrest Leebig, who kills himself in Solarian fear of human contact, not knowing that Daneel is a robot. It is assumed that he also engineered the murder of Rikaine Delmarre. Baley conceals Gladia's role on the grounds that her emotional breakdown was under the pressure of the Solarian way of life. Leebig had instructed one of the Delmarre house robots to detach an arm and give it to Gladia in the heat of an argument. She then hit her husband with it, killing him, before going into a fugue state, after which she remembered nothing. She decides to emigrate to the Spacer planet of Aurora.

Baley returns to Earth to acclaim from his boss. Asked by his boss to reveal any weaknesses he found, Baley says that the features once regarded as Spacer strengths—their robots, low population, and long lives—will ultimately prove to be weaknesses. The lack of cooperation between them discourages an active, exploratory attitude that Earth-born humans will eventually rediscover once they are able to leave Earth.

The story of the after-effects can be found in the sequel The Robots of Dawn.

Asimov examined Solaria's far future in Foundation and Earth (1986).

== Reception ==
Galaxy reviewer Floyd C. Gale praised the novel as "an interesting exercise in scientific detection ... Asimov appears to be laying the groundwork for a new category of science fiction, the S-F detective story".

== Physical distancing ==
Asimov portrays in The Naked Sun a world focused on avoiding physical contact with other people. The Solarians interact with each other largely through technology. They live far from each other, spread out across a sparsely populated planet. People are taught from birth to avoid physical contact, and live on huge estates, either alone or with their spouse only. Face-to-face interaction (referred to in the book as "seeing") is seen as a repugnant chore. Communication takes place through technology: holography, 3-D television. Communicating with each other in this fashion is referred to as "viewing", in contrast to "seeing", which is face-to-face. Communication is frequent, but it is "viewing" of a transmitted image. Nudity in front of others is common. Sex is only practiced for reproduction when replacement of a citizen is necessary, and is considered a chore even more repugnant than seeing. A character remarks that to be in the same room with another person is "most unpleasant.... I feel strongly as though something slimy were about to touch me." A doctor has to "get hardened" to it.

Baley, however (while traveling in a closed vehicle because of his own agoraphobia, resulting from his life in the enclosed cities of Earth), insists on face-to-face conversations. The Solarians' phobia against in-person contact is so strong that a character commits suicide to avoid it.

== Adaptations ==
The novel was adapted for television as an episode of the British anthology series Out of the Unknown, with Baley being portrayed by Paul Maxwell and Daneel by David Collings. Broadcast on BBC2 on 18 February 1969, the story was dramatised by Robert Muller and directed by Rudolph Cartier and the music and sound effects were created by Delia Derbyshire of the BBC Radiophonic Workshop.

Cast of BBC2 Adaptation:

- Paul Maxwell as Elijah Baley
- David Collings as R Daneel Olivaw
- Sheila Burrell as Under-Secretary Minnim
- Neil Hallett as Hannis Gruer
- Erik Chitty as Dr Altim Thool
- Ronald Leigh-Hunt as Corwin Attlebish
- John Robinson as Dr Anselmo Quemot
- Frederick Jaeger as Jothan Leebig
- Trisha Noble as Gladia Delmarre
- Paul Stassino as Rikaine Delmarre
- John Hicks as Bik
- David Cargill as Robot
- Raymond Hardy as Robot
- Roy Patrick as Robot
- John Scott Martin as Robot
- Gerald Taylor as Robot

The Naked Sun was one of six Asimov stories dramatised for the Out of the Unknown series. The others were The Dead Past, Sucker Bait, Satisfaction Guaranteed, Reason (as The Prophet) and Liar!

Although the episode was wiped by the BBC and no copy is known to exist, three of Delia Derbyshire's sound sequences were published on a BBC sound effects album Out of This World, renamed as "Heat Haze", "Frozen Waste" and "Icy Peak". The episode was reconstructed using stills, audio clips, subtitles and CGI for the DVD released by the BFI in November 2014.

In 1978, the novel was adapted in the Soviet Union under the name The Last Alternative (Последняя альтернатива)

In 2023, a Persian translation of the book was published in Iran.

== Sources ==
- Tuck, Donald H. (1974). The Encyclopedia of Science Fiction and Fantasy. Chicago: Advent. p. 22. ISBN 0-911682-20-1.
