= The Robots of Dawn =

1983 novel by Isaac Asimov

- Cover of first edition (hardcover)
- Author: Isaac Asimov
- Cover artist: Kiyoshi Kanai
- Language: English
- Series: Robot series
- Genre: Science fiction
- Publisher: Doubleday
- Publication date: 1983
- Publication place: United States
- Media type: Print (hardback & paperback)
- Pages: 419
- ISBN: 0-385-18400-X
- OCLC: 9555371
- Dewey Decimal: 813/.54 19
- LC Class: PS3551.S5 R6 1983
- Preceded by: The Naked Sun, "Mirror Image"
- Followed by: Robots and Empire

The Robots of Dawn is a "whodunit" science fiction novel by American writer Isaac Asimov, first published in 1983. It is the third novel in Asimov's Robot series.

== Plot summary ==
Detective Elijah Baley of Earth is training with his son and others to overcome their socially ingrained agoraphobia when he is told that the Spacer world of Aurora has requested him to investigate a crime: the destruction of the mind of R. Jander Panell, a humaniform robot identical to R. Daneel Olivaw, with a mental block. The robot's inventor, Han Fastolfe, has admitted that he is the only person with the skill to have done this, but denies having done so. Fastolfe is also a prominent member of the Auroran political faction that favors Earth; therefore, it is politically expedient that he be exonerated. En route to Aurora, Baley again is partnered with R. Daneel Olivaw, and introduced to R. Giskard Reventlov, a robot of an earlier model.

On Aurora, he interviews Gladia Delmarre, R. Jander's last owner, and discovers that Gladia had a sexual relationship with Jander, to the point of considering him husband in an emotional sense. Baley later interviews Fastolfe's estranged daughter, Vasilia Fastolfe (alias "Vasilia Aliena"), who claims that her father would do anything necessary to advance psychohistory, including the incapacitation of Jander and Gladia's heartbreak. Following that, Baley interviews Santirix Gremionis, an Auroran who, with both Gladia and Vasilia, committed the Auroran taboo of offering himself repeatedly (sexually) after rejection. Gremionis denies involvement in the murder, and says he has reported Baley to the Chairman (the executive of the Auroran Government) for slander; but realizes, upon questioning, that Vasilia arranged his infatuation with Gladia.

Next, Baley interviews Kelden Amadiro, Fastolfe's chief political rival and head of the Robotics Institute, who explains the Institute's political motivations: that they wish to see Aurora alone colonize the Galaxy, by means of humaniform robots which at present only Fastolfe can build. On the way from the interview with Amadiro, Baley's airfoil (a personal hovercraft) is forced to stop. The air compressor has been sabotaged. Baley, suspecting Amadiro, orders Daneel and Giskard to flee. When several robots catch up with the car and question Baley, Baley tells them that he ordered Daneel back to the Robotics Institute, and they leave. Baley flees the car into the thunderstorm outside, where his agoraphobia renders him unconscious. He is recovered by Gladia and Giskard, and taken to Gladia's house. At an earlier-arranged meeting with the Chairman, Fastolfe, and Amadiro, Baley accuses Amadiro of sabotaging the car so that he could keep him, helpless, in the Institute, and thus have a legitimate reason to have Daneel there as well, unsupervised. As Baley states, without Fastolfe's cooperation, the only way to obtain knowledge about humaniform robots is to reverse engineer Daneel by thorough questioning, which would have allowed Amadiro to learn the details of his workings.

While logically consistent, Baley's unsupported accusation cannot stand against a formal denial by an Auroran as prominent and respected as Amadiro. However, Baley then confronts Amadiro with the revelation that Amadiro knew of the relationship between Gladia and Jander, and moreover, of her considering him her husband; something quite unthinkable for a native Auroran. Amadiro says he may have heard it from someone, but cannot remember whom.

Baley then states that only one Auroran could have told Amadiro about the relationship: Jander himself. Then, he gives the solution to the mystery: that in Gladia's absence, Amadiro questioned and tested Jander via trimensional viewing (telepresence). Daneel was part of Fastolfe's establishment, and thus well guarded, but Jander was at the house of the much less skilled Gladia, thus questioning him for reverse engineering purposes was much easier. Gremionis was encouraged to court Gladia because they tended to take long walks together, allowing Amadiro more time for his testing. The sabotage to the car was intended to capture Daneel and complete the analysis.

When Baley states that these experiments might have accidentally led to Jander's deactivation, Amadiro snaps and states the experiments were completely harmless. Thus, he effectively admits he was working with Jander, which makes his situation hopeless. As a result, he is forced to compromise with Fastolfe's policies; Amadiro agrees with Earth's right to share in the galactic colonization, while Fastolfe gives the Institute his data about humaniform robot design. Baley, however, confronts Giskard, who admits that Vasilia unknowingly gave him telepathic abilities during experiments when she was a child. Using knowledge derived from Han Fastolfe's mind, Giskard shut down Jander, to thwart Amadiro's attempt to build humaniform robots. Giskard allows Baley to retain knowledge of his abilities, but prevents him (with the help of his telepathic abilities) from revealing the secret.

== Characters ==
Below is a list of all the major and minor characters in the book, in order of appearance, with plot detail.

- Elijah Baley: a plainclothesman (police detective) who works on Earth. He is called to solve the case on Aurora.
- Jezebel "Jessie" Baley: Elijah’s wife (mentioned only).
- Bentley Baley: Elijah’s son.
- Gladia: a woman Baley met on Solaria, who is now living on Aurora. She borrowed from Fastolfe the now-destroyed Jander Panell.
- Wilson Roth: the new Commissioner and Baley's boss ever since Julius Enderby's resignation two and a half years before the book's events.
- Lavinia Demachek: Undersecretary at the Terrestrial Department of Justice.
- Albert Minnim: superior of Lavinia (mentioned only).
- Han Fastolfe: a politician on Aurora who is accused by extremists of destroying a humaniform robot. As the leading theoretical roboticist on Aurora, he was the one who programmed Daneel, along with some 56 other robots who help around his house. He has two daughters, and is a Humanist (one who believes all human beings have the right to explore the Galaxy).
- R. Daneel Olivaw: ex-partner of Baley, he is the first successful humaniform creation of Fastolfe.
- R. Giskard Reventlov: a robot Baley meets on the way to Aurora. Constructed by Fastolfe, he is his creator’s right-hand robot.
- Jander Panell: the robot that was destroyed on Aurora. Originally owned by Fastolfe, he was lent to Gladia for use.
- Roj Nemennuh Sarton: the designer of Daneel. He was murdered on Earth (mentioned only).
- Fanya: the current wife of Fastolfe (mentioned only).
- Pandion: a robot serving Gladia.
- Borgraf: a robot serving Gladia.
- Vasilia Aliena: Fastolfe’s daughter, whom he raised himself against Auroran custom. She is a professional roboticist and is part of the Robotics Institute of Aurora against Fastolfe.
- Lumen: Fastolfe’s daughter with whom he has little contact. She is running for political office on a Globalist ticket, a party that believes Aurorans deserve the Galaxy. (mentioned only)
- Santirix Gremionis: an Auroran who repeatedly offered himself to Gladia. He is a hair and clothing designer, and was questioned by Baley.
- Brundij: a robot serving Gremionis.
- Kelden Amadiro: the head of the Robotics Institute of Aurora.
- Maloon Cicis: a roboticist with whom Baley spoke to get to Amadiro.
- Rutilan Horder: chairman of the Legislature of Aurora.

== Reception ==
Dave Langford reviewed The Robots of Dawn for White Dwarf #53, and stated that "It's a cerebral book, with the intellectual pattern of the crime unravelling bit by bit in a skilled display of pacing and plotting, while the high point of physical excitement merely consists of Baley getting caught out in the rain (a quite effective scene, thanks to his agoraphobia)."

It was nominated for both the Hugo and Locus Awards in 1984.
