= I, Robot (1964 The Outer Limits) =

- The Outer Limits episode
- Episode no.: Season 2 Episode 9
- Directed by: Leon Benson
- Teleplay by: Robert C. Dennis
- Based on: I, Robot by Eando Binder
- Cinematography by: Kenneth Peach
- Production code: 43
- Original air date: November 14, 1964

Guest appearance
- Howard da Silva

Episode chronology
| ← Previous "Wolf 359" | Next → "The Inheritors" |

"I, Robot" is an episode of the original The Outer Limits television show. It first aired on November 14, 1964, during the second season. It was remade under the same title in 1995. Leonard Nimoy appeared in both versions.

== Opening narration ==
God looked upon his world and called it good, but Man was not content. He looked for ways to make it better and built machines to do the work. But in vain we build the world, unless the builder also grows.

== Plot ==
Defence attorney Thurman Cutler is coaxed out of retirement to take the case for the defense of a robot, Adam Link, against the charge that it willfully murdered its creator Dr. Charles Link. Placed on trial, Adam sits alone in the courtroom, apart from his only friend Nina Link, the professor's niece. Testimony reveals that once Adam was activated he began a trial and error process of learning like that of a child. This suggests that some of his later acts, construed as violent, were in fact a matter of the mechanical man not understanding his own strength, or subtle or vague areas of human thought and emotions. Unfortunately the defense never fully recovers from the revelation that Adam read the novel Frankenstein while absorbing all the books in the Doc's library, and the judge pronounces the robot guilty, even though the Doc's death was accidental. Before Adam can be hauled away to be dismantled, he breaks free of his bonds outside the courthouse to throw a child aside from the path of an oncoming truck, but is smashed into scrap metal in the process. Cutler notes sardonically: "That terrible monster won't ever harm anybody again."

== Closing narration ==
Out of every disaster, a little progress is made. Man will build more robots, and learn how to make them better. And, given enough time, he may learn how to do the same for himself.

== Background ==
The Adam Link stories first appeared in Amazing Stories magazine between 1939 and 1942, written by Eando Binder, a pseudonym used jointly by brothers Earl and Otto Binder, (though only Otto wrote the Adam Link stories). Unusually for a robot at that time, Adam was a sympathetic character with genuine emotions, and the tales were narrated by Adam himself. "I, Robot" first appeared in Amazing Stories Vol. 13/no. 1 (January 1939), and was continued in "The Trial of Adam Link, Robot" (Amazing Stories vol. 13/no. 7 (July 1939)). The original story ends with Adam intending to turn himself off, believing he will not be allowed a trial, and although innocent, writing his confession.

The Outer Limits episode is based on these first two stories. In this TV adaptation, writer Robert C. Dennis invented the character of attorney Thurman Cutler, greatly expanded the role of a nameless newspaperman, mentioned only in passing in Binder's original story, into Judson Ellis and changed Prof. Link's relative to a woman. The ending was also changed so that Adam is found guilty, ending up as scrap metal when saving a child from being hit by a truck outside the courthouse; in the original "Trial" story, he is vindicated and set free.

Unlike his TV counterpart, the original Adam Link was a six-foot-tall android. In the following four stories ("Adam Link in Business", Vol. 14/no. 1, Jan 1940; "Adam Link's Vengeance", Vol. 14/no. 2, Feb 1940; "Adam Link, Robot Detective", Vol. 14/no. 5, May 1940; and "Adam Link, Champion Athlete", Vol.14/no. 7, Jul 1940) he amasses a fortune as a business consultant, enough to fund a rejuvenation of slum areas and build a "female" robot named Eve to be his wife, is betrayed by a friend who uses him to rob banks, becomes a private detective to find the person who framed Eve for 3 murders and performs a series of athletic challenges. The later stories, ("Adam Link fights a War", Vol.14/no. 12, Dec 1940; "Adam Link in the Past", Vol.15.no. 2, Feb 1941; "Adam Link Faces A Revolt", Vol. 15/no. 5, May 1941; and "Adam Link Saves The World", Vol.16/no.4, Apr 1942) were more outlandish SF adventure tales with Adam and Eve fighting evil robots and aliens in defense of the human race. All 10 stories were adapted by Otto Binder into a 174-page novel Adam Link: Robot, and first published in the US by Paperback Library in 1965.

"I, Robot" first appeared in color comic strip form in 1954 in EC Comics Weird Science-Fantasy #27, followed by "The Trial of Adam Link" in #28 and "Adam Link in Business" in #29, all adapted by Albert Feldstein, with art by Joe Orlando. Later an irregular series of black and white Adam Link comic strips, written by Otto Binder and drawn by Joe Orlando, were published in Warren Magazines' Creepy between 1965 and 1967 ("I, Robot", #2 Apr 1965; "The Trial Of Adam Link!", #4 Aug 1965; "Adam Link in Business", #6 Dec 1965; "Adam Link's Mate!", #8 Apr 1966; "Adam Link's Vengeance!", #9 Jun 1966; "Adam Link, Robot Detective!", #12 Dec 1966; 'Adam Link Gangster!", #13 Feb 1967; "Adam Link, Champion Athlete", #15 Aug 1967).

While there is an Isaac Asimov fixup collection of the same name that predates this episode, the aforementioned story by Binder (which this episode is based on) was the first.

== Cast ==
- Howard da Silva – as Thurman Cutler
- Ford Rainey – as D.A. Thomas Coyle
- Marianna Hill – as Nina Link
- Leonard Nimoy – as newspaper reporter Judson Ellis
- John Hoyt – as Professor Hebbel
- Robert Sorrells – as Fred
- Hugh Sanders – as Sheriff Barclay
- Mary Jackson – as Mrs. McCrae
- Peter Brocco – as Professor "Doc" Link
- Ken Drake – as The Judge
- Christine Matchett – as Evie
- Read Morgan – as Adam Link (uncredited)
- John Caper Jr. – as Adam's Voice (uncredited)
- John Hudkins – as Truck Driver (uncredited)

== See also ==
- Adam Link
- "I, Robot"
- "I, Robot" (1995 The Outer Limits)
