= I, Robot (short story) =

1939 science fiction short story by Eando Binder

- Short story by Eando Binder
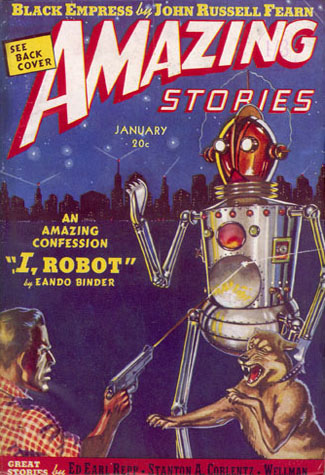
- Country: United States
- Language: English
- Genre: Science fiction

Publication
- Published in: Amazing Stories
- Publication type: Science fiction magazine
- Publication date: January 1939
- Series: Adam Link

"I, Robot" is a science fiction short story by Eando Binder (nom de plume for Earl and Otto Binder), part of a series about a robot named Adam Link. It was published in the January 1939 issue of Amazing Stories.

== Plot ==
The story is about a robot's confession. Some weeks earlier, its builder, Dr. Charles Link, built it in the basement. Link teaches his robot to walk, talk and behave civilly. Link's housekeeper sees the robot just enough to be horrified by it, but his dog is totally loyal to it. The robot is fully educated in a few weeks, Link then names it Adam Link, and it professes a desire to serve any human master who will have it. Soon afterwards, a heavy object falls on Dr. Link by accident and kills him. His housekeeper instantly assumes that the robot has murdered Dr. Link, and calls in armed men to hunt it down and destroy it. They do not succeed; in fact, they provoke the robot to retaliate, both by refusing to listen to it and by accidentally killing Dr. Link's dog. Back at the house, the robot finds a copy of Frankenstein, which Dr. Link had carefully hidden from the robot, and finally somewhat understands the prejudice against it. In the end the robot decides that it simply is not worth killing several people just to get a hearing, writes its confession, and prepares to turn itself off.

== Adaptations ==
Binder's story was very innovative for its time, one of the first robot stories to break away from the Frankenstein clichés.

Three of the Adam Link stories were adapted by Al Feldstein and illustrated by Joe Orlando in 1955 issues of the EC (Entertaining Comics) publication Weird Science-Fantasy. Published were "I, Robot," in issue #27 (January–February); "The Trial of Adam Link," in #28 (March–April); and "Adam Link in Business," in #29 (May–June).

A decade later, Binder adapted eight of the stories for Creepy magazine over 1965–1967, and Orlando provided new artwork. The stories were "I, Robot" (issue #2); "The Trial of Adam Link" (#4); "Adam Link in Business" (#6); "Adam Link's Mate" (#8); "Adam Link's Vengeance" (#9); "Adam Link, Robot Detective" (#12); "Adam Link, Gangbuster" (#13); and "Adam Link, Champion Athlete" (#15).

“I, Robot” plus “The Trial of Adam Link, Robot” were adapted for an episode of the 1960s science fiction anthology series The Outer Limits in 1964, starring Leonard Nimoy as a journalist and Howard Da Silva as the robot's lawyer, with Read Morgan as Adam Link. In this version, (I, Robot (1964 The Outer Limits)), Robot Adam is caught and put on trial. While the death of Dr. Link is shown in flashback as an accident, in the end Adam is found guilty. On the way to be transported to his execution, a girl runs out into traffic and Adam rushes to save her from the oncoming vehicle. He is broken into pieces, "cheating the executioner".

For the 1990s revival of the Outer Limits series, the story was again reprised with Leonard Nimoy as the robot's lawyer and John Novak as the voice of the robot. In this version, the robot accidentally kills his creator when Dr. Link attempts to convert him into a military killing machine by destroying his more human qualities. Similar to the 1964 episode, Adam is put on trial, and in the end, he is destroyed by a speeding vehicle while saving a human life (this time, the District Attorney who prosecuted him and wanted him dismantled).

== Influence on Isaac Asimov ==
Isaac Asimov was heavily influenced by the Binder short story. In his introduction to the story in Isaac Asimov Presents the Great SF Stories (1979), Asimov wrote:

It certainly caught my attention. Two months after I read it, I began 'Robbie', about a sympathetic robot, and that was the start of my positronic robot series. Eleven years later, when nine of my robot stories were collected into a book, the publisher named the collection I, Robot over my objections. My book is now the more famous, but Otto's story was there first.
