= Puzzle of the Space Pyramids =

1971 novel by Eando Binder

Puzzle of the Space Pyramids is a fix-up science fiction novel by American writer Eando Binder. It tells the story of several successive space expeditions to Mars, Venus, Mercury and Jupiter. As each planet is found to harbor various (usually hostile) alien life, each expedition must survive both the elements and the attacks by the natives. The continuing thread through the expeditions is the discovery of an ancient pyramid on each planet they explore. These puzzling pyramids were apparently built by an unknown primeval civilization far older than and unrelated to the current inhabitants. When a final pyramid is found on Jupiter, its existence may point the way to their builder's secret.

== Contents ==
The novel is a fix-up novel taken from stories published in the magazine Thrilling Wonder Stories.

- "Via Etherline" (October 1937; chapters 1-2)
- "Via Asteroid" (February 1938, chapters 3-4)
- "Via Death" (August 1938; chapters 5-6)
- "Via Venus" (October 1939; chapters 7-8)
- "Via Pyramid" (January 1940; chapters 9-11)
- "Via Sun" (March 1940; chapters 12-13)
- "Via Mercury" (October 1940; chapters 14-16)
- "Via Catacombs" (November 1940; chapters 17-19)
- "Via Intelligence" (December 1940; chapters 20-22)
- "Via Jupiter" (February 1942; chapters 23-33)
