= Marjorie Nelson =

American actress

- Born: November 2, 1923; Seattle, Washington, U.S.
- Died: February 12, 2010 (aged 86); Seattle, Washington, U.S.
- Occupation: Actress
- Years active: 1965–2004
- Spouse(s): Howard Da Silva (1949–1960); Victor Steinbrueck

Marjorie Nelson (November 2, 1923 – February 12, 2010) was an American actress.

Born in Seattle, Nelson appeared in more than eight films from 1965 to 2004 and acted on stage at the Seattle Repertory Theatre beginning in 1940. She acted on stage in New York for 12 years.

Nelson's support of international human rights and her opposition to nuclear proliferation led to her being one of the actors blacklisted in the 1950s as a result of the House Un-American Activities Committee.

In the 1960s, Nelson taught at the Cornish School of Allied Arts in Seattle.

Nelson was married to actor Howard Da Silva from 1949 to 1960. They had two daughters. She married Seattle architect Victor Steinbrueck, and they founded the Port Townsend Festival Theatre, for which she served as the executive director.

On February 12, 2010, Nelson died, aged 86.

== Selected filmography ==
Year	Title	Role	Notes
1966	The Slender Thread	Mrs. Thomas	
1992	Crazy in Love	Helen Avery	
1998	Under Heaven	Mrs. Fletcher	
