= Crazy in Love (film) =

- Based on: Crazy in Love by Luanne Rice
- Screenplay by: Gerald Ayres
- Directed by: Martha Coolidge
- Starring: Holly Hunter; Gena Rowlands; Bill Pullman; Julian Sands; Herta Ware; Frances McDormand
- Composer: Cynthia Millar
- Country of origin: United States
- Original language: English

Production
- Producers: Karen Danaher-Dorr; Joan Stein
- Cinematography: Johnny E. Jensen
- Editor: Steven Cohen
- Running time: 100 minutes
- Production company: Turner Pictures

Original release
- Network: TNT
- Release: August 10, 1992

Crazy in Love is a 1992 American comedy film directed by Martha Coolidge and written by Gerald Ayres. It is based on the 1988 novel Crazy in Love by Luanne Rice. The film stars Holly Hunter, Gena Rowlands, Bill Pullman, Julian Sands, Herta Ware and Frances McDormand. The film premiered on TNT on August 10, 1992.

== Cast ==
- Holly Hunter as Georgie Symonds
- Gena Rowlands as Honora Swift
- Bill Pullman as Nick Symonds
- Julian Sands as Mark Constable
- Herta Ware as Pem
- Frances McDormand as Clare
- Joanne Baron as Mona Tuckman
- Michael MacRae as John Rice
- Kit McDonough as Loretta
- Diane Robin as Jean Snizort
- Marjorie Nelson as Helen Avery
- Krisha Fairchild as Vivien
- Peter Lohnes as Donald
- Gary Lee Dansenburg as Eugene
- Billy O'Sullivan as Casey
- George Catalano as Pete Margolis
- Alexis Alexander as Mrs. Avery's Secretary

== See also ==
- List of American films of 1992
