= Seattle Repertory Theatre =

Theatre company in Seattle, Washington

Coordinates: 47°37′26.6″N 122°21′13.11″W

- Formation: 1963
- Type: Theatre group
- Artistic director: Dámaso Rodríguez
Seattle Repertory Theatre
- Interactive map of Seattle Repertory Theatre
- Address: 155 Mercer Street; Seattle, Washington; United States
- Capacity: 673 (Bagley Wright Theater), 282 (Leo Kreielsheimer Theater); 114 (PONCHO Forum)
Construction
- Opened: October 13, 1983

Seattle Rep (Seattle Repertory Theatre) is a major regional theater located in Seattle, Washington, at the Seattle Center. Founded in 1963, it is led by Artistic Director Dámaso Rodríguez and Managing Director Jeffrey Herrmann.

== History ==
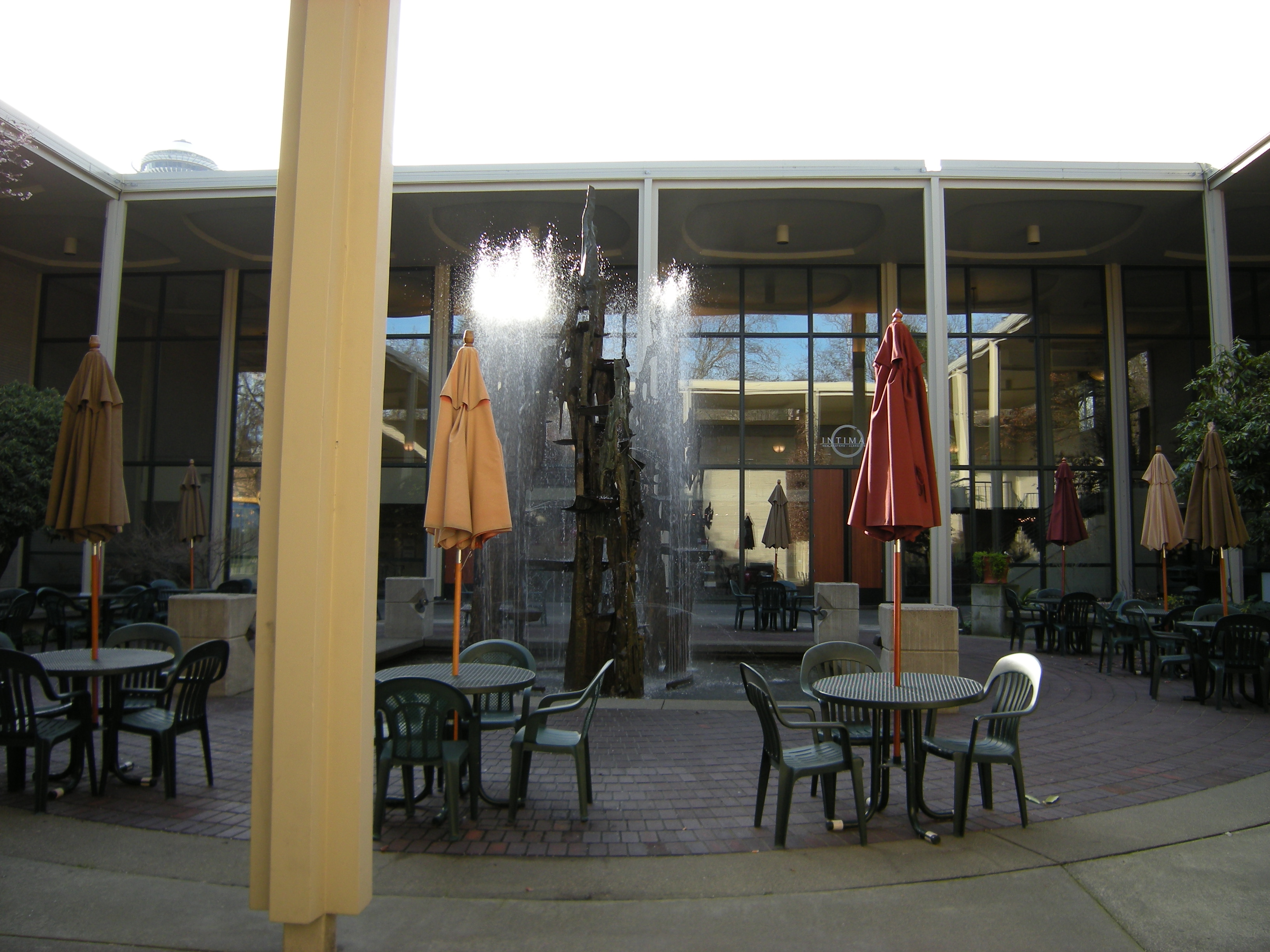
Courtyard of the Seattle Playhouse, during the period it was renamed the Intiman Playhouse (2009).

Seattle Rep's first home was the Seattle Playhouse, built as part of the fair grounds for the 1962 Century 21 Exposition, Seattle's 1962 World's Fair. The building, extant as of 2009, was renovated in 1987 as a home for the Intiman Theatre. Actor Hal Holbrook had appeared at the Playhouse during the fair, and is believed to be the person who suggested it as a home for a repertory theater company. Seattle businessman and arts patron Bagley Wright and others raised money and recruited artistic leadership to found what became Seattle Repertory Theater ("Seattle Rep" or formerly "The Rep"). Stuart Vaughan was the founding artistic director

It received the 1990 Regional Theatre Tony Award.

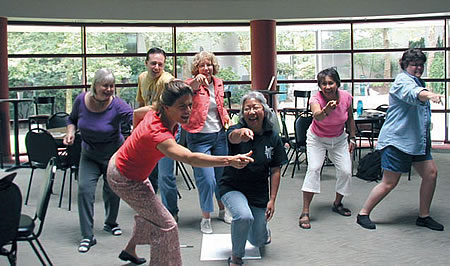
"Bringing Theatre into the Classroom" participants work on integrating tableaux into their lesson plans.

== Stages ==
=== Bagley Wright Theater ===
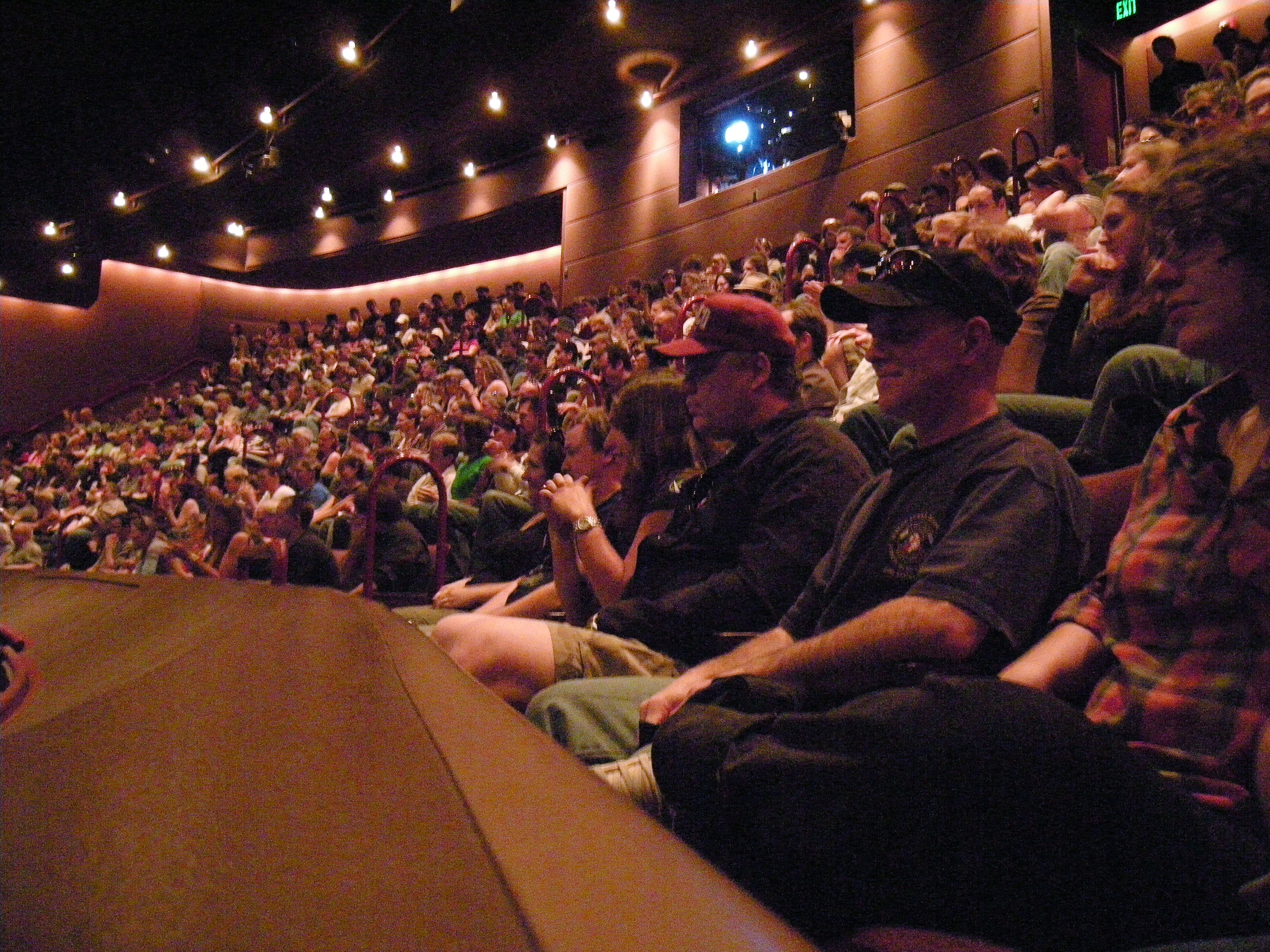
The balcony of the Bagley Wright Theatre during Bumbershoot 2008.

The Bagley Wright Theater, named in honor of the president of Seattle Rep's first board of trustees, opened on October 13, 1983 with the world premiere of Michael Weller's The Ballad of Soapy Smith, directed by Robert Egan, and featuring a cast of Seattle actors including Dennis Arndt (in the title role), John Aylward, Frank Corrado, Paul Hostetler, Richard Riehle, Michael Santo, Marjorie Nelson, Ted D'Arms, Kurt Beattie, Clayton Corzatte, and William Ontiveros. Also in the cast were Kevin Tighe and Kate Mulgrew. The Bagley Wright Theater is a city-owned facility.

The theater has a proscenium stage and a seating capacity of 678 seats. The stage is approximately 65 feet (20 m) to the last row of the house.

=== Leo K. Theater ===
The Leo Kreielsheimer Theater ("Leo K.") opened in December 1996 as Seattle Rep's "second stage." The Leo K. was made possible in great part to a US$2 million gift from The Kreielsheimer Foundation, a US$1 million gift from then board chair Marsha S. Glazer, and the leadership of Capital Campaign chairs Ann Ramsay-Jenkins and Stanley Savage. There are 282 seats total: 192 on the orchestra level (including loge), plus 90 balcony and box seats. It is approximately 25 feet (7.6 m) from the stage to the rear wall. There are 5 wheelchair locations.

The orchestra seating consists of 139 seats in 9 rows, with 8–20 seats per row; the loge adds 51 seats, in 2 rows of 27 and 24 seats, respectively. The balcony provides an additional 88 seats, in 3 rows, with 29–30 seats per row; additionally, there are 4 box seats at balcony level.

=== PONCHO Forum ===
The PONCHO Forum has a capacity of 133 seats and is set up for general admission, with stadium seating.
