= Howard da Silva =

American actor (1909–1986)

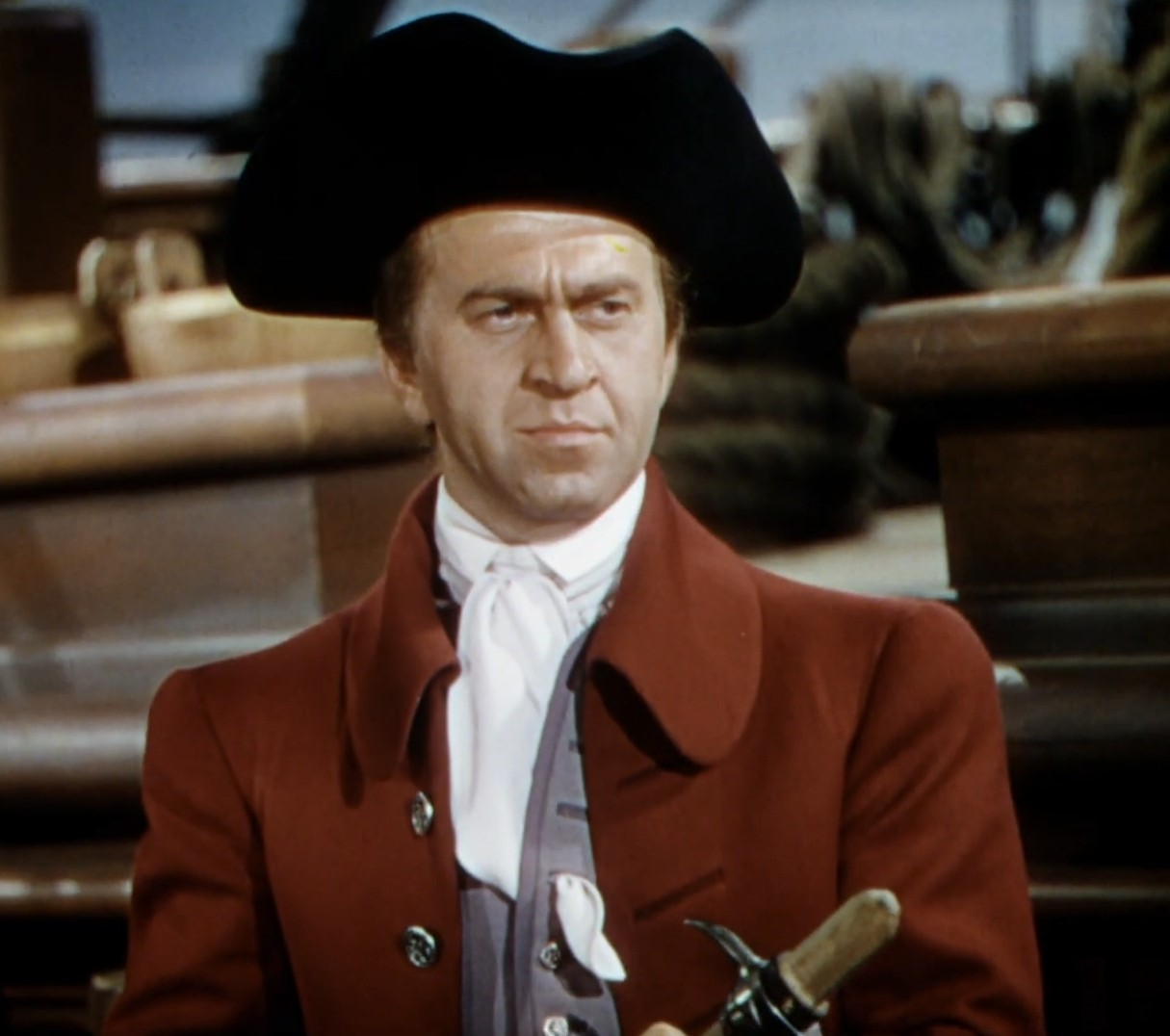
- Da Silva in Unconquered (1947).
- Born: Howard Silverblatt; May 4, 1909; Cleveland, Ohio, U.S.
- Died: February 16, 1986 (aged 76); Ossining, New York, U.S.
- Occupations: Actor; singer
- Years active: 1930–1984
- Spouses: Evelyn Horowitz (m. 1930, divorced) Jane Taylor (m. 1941; div. 1948) Marjorie Nelson (m. 1950; div. 1961) Nancy Nutter (m. 1961)
- Children: 5

Signature
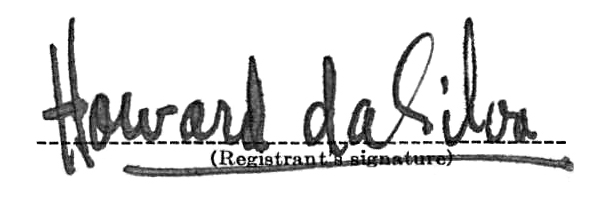

Howard da Silva (born Howard Silverblatt; May 4, 1909 – February 16, 1986) was an American actor, singer, and theatre director. He was cast in dozens of productions on the New York stage, appeared in more than two dozen television programs, and acted in more than 50 feature films.

Adept at both drama and musicals on the stage, he originated the role of Jud Fry in the original 1943 run of the Rodgers and Hammerstein musical Oklahoma!, and also portrayed the prosecuting attorney in the 1957 stage production of Compulsion. Da Silva was nominated for a 1960 Tony Award as Best Featured Actor in a Musical for his work in Fiorello!, a musical about New York City mayor LaGuardia. In 1961, da Silva directed Purlie Victorious, by Ossie Davis.

Many of his early feature films were of the noir genre in which he often played villains, such as Eddie Harwood in The Blue Dahlia and the sadistic Captain Francis Thompson in Two Years Before the Mast (both 1946). Da Silva's performances as historic figures are among some of his most notable work: he was Lincoln's brawling friend Jack Armstrong in both play (1939) and film (1940) versions of Abe Lincoln in Illinois written by Robert Sherwood; Benjamin Franklin in the 1969–1972 stage musical 1776 and a reprisal of the role for the 1972 film version of the production; Soviet leader Nikita Khrushchev in The Missiles of October (1974); Franklin D. Roosevelt in The Private Files of J. Edgar Hoover (1977); and Louis B. Mayer in Mommie Dearest (1981).

Da Silva's American television character work included the defense attorney representing the robot in The Outer Limits episode "I, Robot" (1964), and district attorney Anthony Cleese in For the People (1965). In the 1970s, da Silva appeared in 26 episodes of the radio series the CBS Radio Mystery Theater. For his performance as Eddie in the Great Performances production of Verna: USO Girl (1978), the actor received a Primetime Emmy Award for Outstanding Performance by a Supporting Actor in a Comedy or Drama Special.

== Early life ==
Da Silva was born in Cleveland, Ohio, the son of Bertha (née Sen) and Benjamin Silverblatt, a dress cutter. His parents were both immigrants, Yiddish-speaking Jews born in the Russian Empire. His mother was a women's-rights activist. Before beginning his acting career on the stage, he was employed as a steelworker.

Da Silva was a graduate of the Carnegie Institute of Technology. He studied acting with Eva Le Gallienne beginning in 1928 at the Civic Repertory Theatre. He changed his surname for acting purposes, adopting the Portuguese Da Silva (his name is sometimes misspelled Howard De Silva).

== Career ==
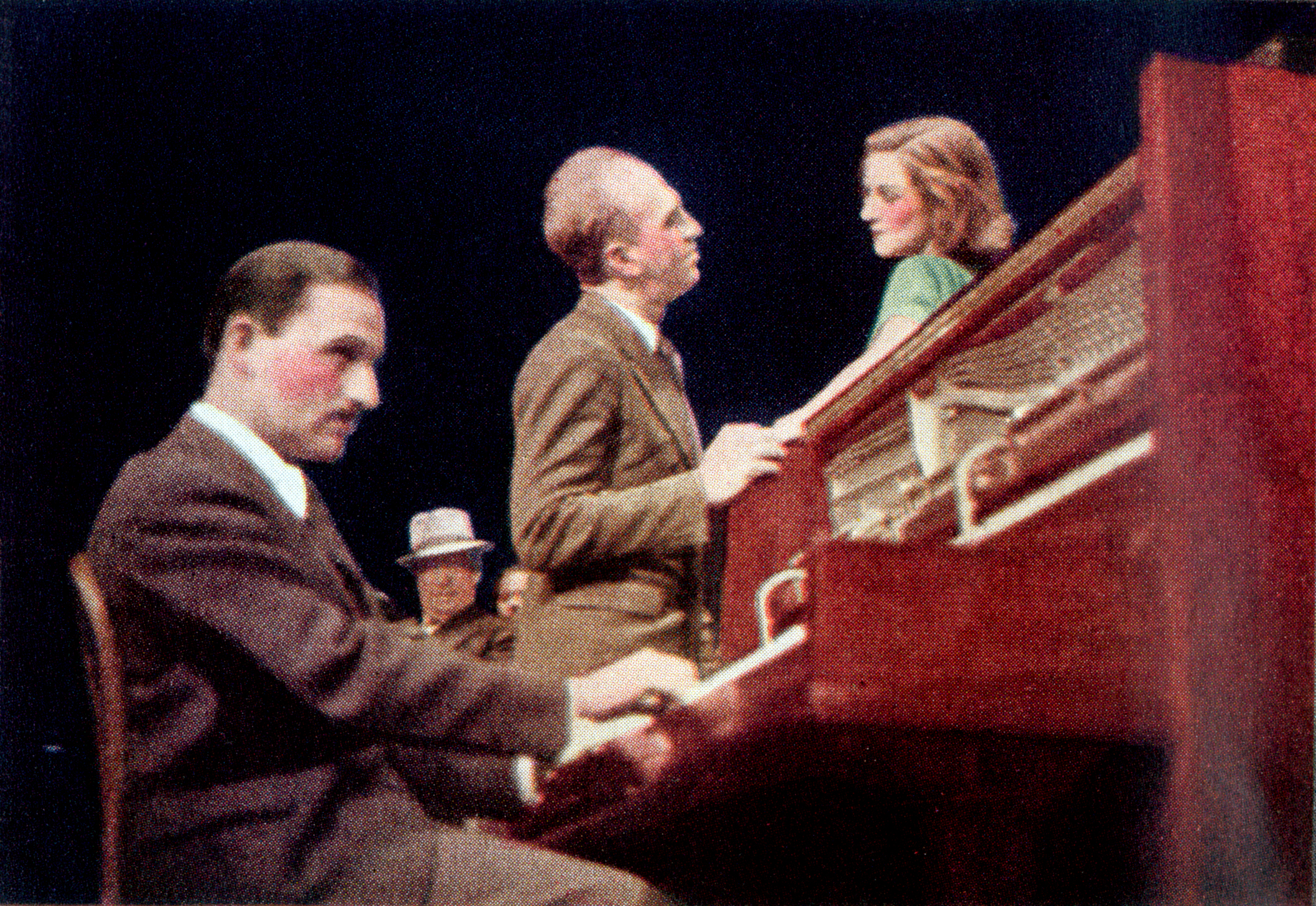
Marc Blitzstein, Howard Da Silva and Olive Stanton in the Mercury Theatre production of The Cradle Will Rock (1938)

Da Silva appeared in a number of Broadway musicals, including the role of Larry Foreman in the legendary first production of Marc Blitzstein's musical The Cradle Will Rock (1938). Later, he costarred in the original 1943 stage production of Rodgers and Hammerstein's Oklahoma!, playing the role of the psychopathic Jud Fry. He was the easygoing Ben Marino who opposed Tammany Hall in the Pulitzer winning musical Fiorello!.

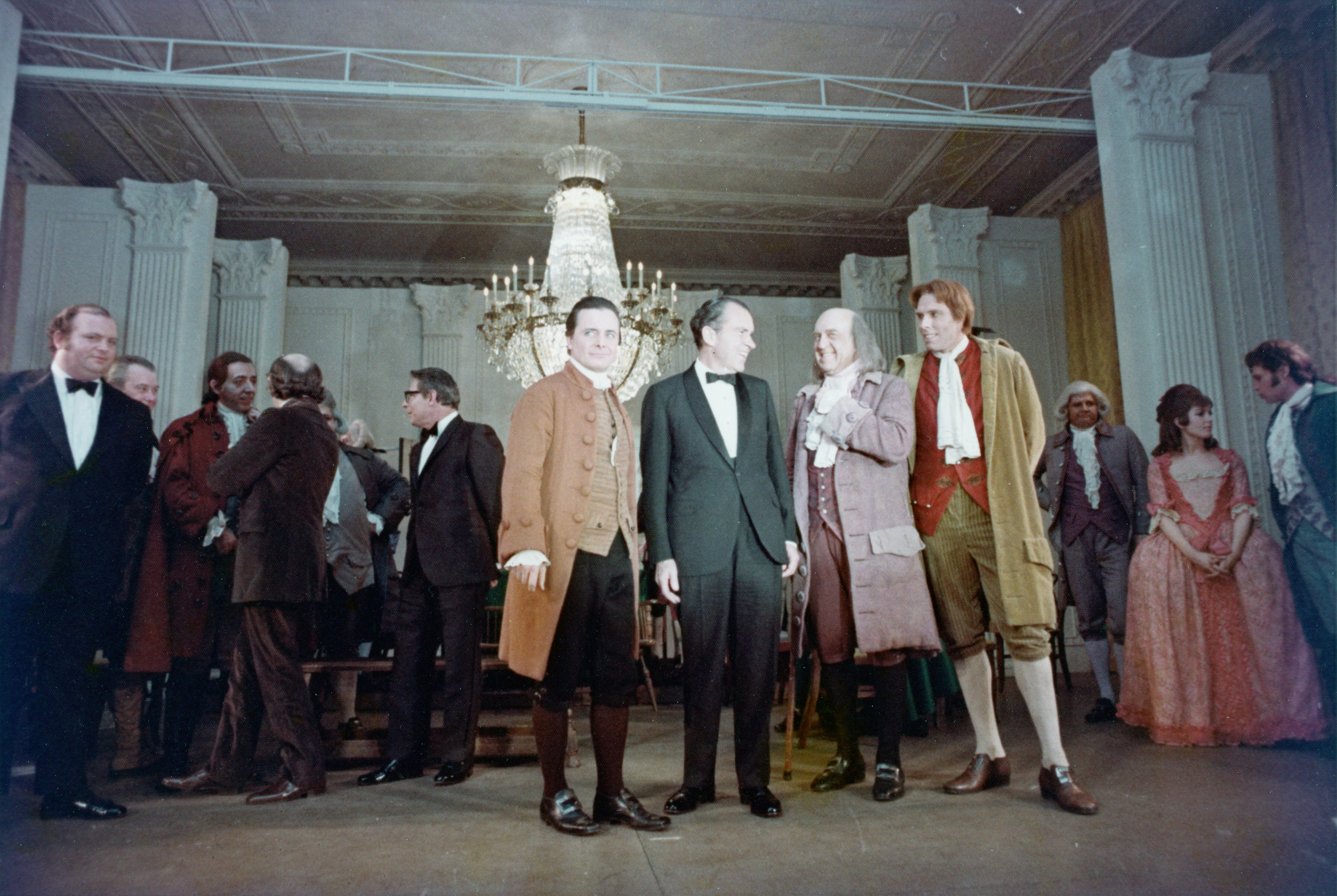
Da Silva and other cast members of 1776 with Richard Nixon following a performance of the Tony Award-winning musical in the East Room of the White House (1971)

In 1969, da Silva originated the role of Benjamin Franklin in the musical 1776. Four days before the show opened on Broadway, he suffered a minor heart attack but refused to seek medical assistance because he wanted to make sure critics saw his performance. After the four official critic performances were over, the cast left to go to the cast party and da Silva went to the hospital and immediately took a leave of absence from the production. While da Silva recuperated, his understudy, Rex Everhart, took over the role and performed on the cast recording. Da Silva was able to reprise his role in the 1972 film version and appeared on that soundtrack album.

Da Silva did summer stock at the Pine Brook Country Club, located in the countryside of Nichols, Connecticut, with the Group Theatre (New York) formed by Harold Clurman, Cheryl Crawford and Lee Strasberg in the 1930s and early 1940s.

Da Silva appeared in over 60 motion pictures. Some of his memorable roles include a leading mutineer in The Sea Wolf (1941), Ray Milland's bartender in The Lost Weekend (1945), and the half-blind criminal "Chicamaw 'One-Eye' Mobley" in They Live by Night (1949). He also released an album on Monitor Records (MP 595) of political songs and ballads entitled Politics and Poker.

Da Silva returned to the stage, and he was nominated for the 1960 Tony Award for Best Featured Actor in a Musical for his role as "Ben Marino" in Fiorello! (1959). After being blacklisted, da Silva and Nelson left Los Angeles for New York to perform in The World of Sholom Aleichem.

Da Silva was nominated for the British BAFTA Film Award for Best Foreign Actor for his performance as Dr. Swinford in David and Lisa (1962). Da Silva portrayed Soviet Premier Khrushchev in the television docudrama The Missiles of October (1974). He won the Emmy Award for Outstanding Performance by a Supporting Actor in a Comedy or Drama Special for his role as Eddie in Verna: U.S.O. Girl (1978) with Sissy Spacek.

Da Silva's TV guest appearances, after the era in which blacklisting was strongest, include such programs as The Outer Limits, Ben Casey, The Man from U.N.C.L.E., The Fugitive, Gentle Ben, Mannix, Love, American Style, Kung Fu, and Archie Bunker's Place.

Da Silva also played President Franklin D. Roosevelt in The Private Files of J. Edgar Hoover (1977), Hollywood mogul Louis B. Mayer in Mommie Dearest (1981), and American statesman Benjamin Franklin in both 1776 (1972) and a documentary depicting the life of Ben Franklin shown at Franklin's house in Philadelphia, as well as in a television commercial for Consolidated Edison. He appeared in two different film adaptations of F. Scott Fitzgerald's 1925 novel, The Great Gatsby. In the 1949 production with Alan Ladd as Gatsby, da Silva played garage owner George Wilson; in the 1974 film with Robert Redford, da Silva was Meyer Wolfsheim, the flamboyant gambler with the interesting cufflinks. In his final appearance on screen, da Silva played a New York photographer fascinated with the reclusive Greta Garbo in the film Garbo Talks (1984), directed by Sidney Lumet.

He also did voice acting in 26 episodes of the popular 1974–82 radio thriller series CBS Radio Mystery Theater (between July 1974 and February 1977). In 1978, he recorded linking narration for episodes of the British television program Doctor Who broadcast in the United States.

=== Blacklisting ===
Da Silva became one of hundreds of artists blacklisted in the entertainment industry during the House Committee on Unamerican Activities investigation into alleged Communist influence in the industry. Following his March 1951 testimony, in which he repeatedly invoked his Fifth Amendment rights, his lead performance in the completed feature film Slaughter Trail was re-shot with actor Brian Donlevy. Da Silva continued to find work on the New York stage, but did not work in feature films again until 1961 when he appeared in David and Lisa (a BAFTA-nominated performance). He was eventually cleared of any charges in 1960, but not before his career in television had also stalled, with no work between 1951 and 1959 when he appeared in The Play of the Week. The brief respite was followed by another television career void until his appearance in a 1963 episode of The Defenders. That was the beginning of the end of da Silva's blacklist, and the show's producer Herb Brodkin paired da Silva with William Shatner when he created the television series For the People.

== Personal life ==
Da Silva's first wife was Evelyn Horowitz. They were married on August 13, 1930, in Manhattan, New York City.

His second wife was stage actress Jane Louise Taylor, born in 1913 in New York. They were married in January 1941 in Yuma, Arizona, and had one son. They were divorced on July 28, 1948, in Los Angeles, California.

His third wife was actress Marjorie Nelson; they were married on August 19, 1950, in Hollywood, California. Da Silva and Nelson had two daughters and were divorced on May 9, 1961, in Juárez, Mexico.

His fourth wife was Nancy Nutter (1931-2025); they were married in May or June 1961 in Greenwich, England.

=== Death ===
Da Silva died of lymphoma, aged 76, in Ossining, New York.

== Filmography ==
=== Film ===
Year	Title	Role	Director(s)	Notes	Ref.
1935	Once in a Blue Moon	Bit part	Ben Hecht, Charles MacArthur	Uncredited	
1938	Marie Antoinette	Toulon	W. S. Van Dyke	Uncredited	
1940	Abe Lincoln in Illinois	Jack Armstrong	John Cromwell		
1940	I'm Still Alive	Red Garvey	Irving Reis		
1941	The Dog in the Orchard	Foster	Jean Negulesco	Short film	
1941	The Sea Wolf	Harrison	Michael Curtiz		
1941	Strange Alibi	Monson	D. Ross Lederman		
1941	Sergeant York	Lem	Howard Hawks		
1941	Bad Men of Missouri	Greg Bilson	Ray Enright		
1941	Three Sons o' Guns	Radio announcer	Benjamin Stoloff	Uncredited	
1941	Navy Blues	Petty Officer	Lloyd Bacon	Uncredited	
1941	Nine Lives Are Not Enough	J.B. Murray – City Editor	A. Edward Sutherland		
1941	Blues in the Night	Sam Paryas	Anatole Litvak		
1941	At the Stroke of Twelve	Angie the Ox	Jean Negulesco	Short film	
1941	Steel Against the Sky	Bugs Little	A. Edward Sutherland		
1942	Wild Bill Hickok Rides	Ringo	Ray Enright		
1942	Bullet Scars	Frank Dillon	D. Ross Lederman		
1942	Juke Girl	Cully	Curtis Bernhardt		
1942	The Big Shot	Sandor	Lewis Seiler		
1942	The Omaha Trail	Ben Santley	Edward Buzzell		
1942	Reunion in France	Anton Stregel	Jules Dassin		
1942	Native Land	Jim	Leo Hurwitz, Paul Strand	Documentary	
1943	Keeper of the Flame	Jason Rickards	George Cukor		
1943	Tonight We Raid Calais	Sgt. Block	John Brahm		
1945	Duffy's Tavern	Tough guy	Hal Walker		
1945	The Lost Weekend	Nat	Billy Wilder		
1946	The Blue Dahlia	Eddie Harwood	George Marshall		
1946	Two Years Before the Mast	Captain Francis A. Thompson	John Farrow		
1947	Blaze of Noon	Mike Gafferty	John Farrow		
1947	Variety Girl	Himself	George Marshall		
1947	Unconquered	Martin Garth	Cecil B. DeMille		
1948	They Live by Night	Chickamaw	Nicholas Ray		
1949	The Great Gatsby	Wilson	Elliott Nugent		
1949	Border Incident	Owen Parkson	Anthony Mann		
1950	The Underworld Story	Carl Durham	Cy Endfield		
1950	Wyoming Mail	Cavanaugh	Reginald LeBorg		
1950	Tripoli	Capt. Demetrios	Will Price		
1950	Three Husbands	Dan McCabe	Irving Reis		
1951	Fourteen Hours	Deputy Police Chief Moskar	Henry Hathaway		
1951	M	Inspector Carney	Joseph Losey		
1962	David and Lisa	Dr. Alan Swinford	Frank Perry		
1964	The Outrage	Prospector	Martin Ritt		
1964	Hamlet	Claudius	Bruce Minnix, Joseph Papp	Taped New York Shakespeare Festival performance	
1966	Nevada Smith	Warden	Henry Hathaway		
1972	1776	Benjamin Franklin	Peter H. Hunt		
1974	The Great Gatsby	Meyer Wolfsheim	Jack Clayton		
1975	I'm a Stranger Here Myself	Narrator	David Halpern		
1976	Hollywood on Trial	Himself	David Helpern		
1977	The Private Files of J. Edgar Hoover	Franklin D. Roosevelt	Larry Cohen		
1981	Mommie Dearest	Louis B. Mayer	Frank Perry		
1984	Garbo Talks	Angelo Dokakis	Sidney Lumet		

=== Television ===
Year	Title	Role	Notes	Ref.
1950	The Silver Theatre		Episode: "My Heart's in the Highlands"	
1951	The Bigelow Theatre		Episode: "My Heart's in the Highlands"	
1959	The Play of the Week	Dupont-Dufour Sr.	Episode: "Thieves Carnival"	
1963	The Defenders	Peter Cole	Episode: "The Bagman"	
1963	East Side/West Side	Wallace Mapes	Episode: "I Believe E Except After C"	
1963	The Doctors and the Nurses	Dr. McClendon	Episode: "Disaster Call"	
1964	The Defenders	Arnold Fermuller	Episode: "The Man Who"	
1964	The Outer Limits	Thurman Cutler	Episode: "I, Robot"	
1965	For the People	Anthony Celese	13 episodes	
1965	Ben Casey	Ulysses Pagoras	Episode: "The Day They Stole Country General"	
1965	Ben Casey	Cantor Nathan Birmbaum	Episode: "A Nightingale Named Nathan"	
1966	The Man from U.N.C.L.E.	Captain Basil Calhoun	Episode: "The Foreign Legion Affair"	
1966	The Loner	Gonzales	Episode: "To Hang a Dead Man"	
1966	The Fugitive	Pete Dawes	Episode: "Death is the Door Prize"	
1967	N.Y.P.D.	Dimitchik	Episode: "Old Gangsters Never Die"	
1967	Gentle Ben	Phillip Garrett	Episode: "Battle of Wedlow Woods"	
1968	Mannix	Aram Karmalis	Episode: "You Can Get Killed Out There"	
1972	Keep the Faith	Rabbi Mossman	TV film	
1973	Love, American Style	Doctor Wazanskyi	Episode: "Love and the End of the Line"	
1973	Kung Fu	Otto Schultz	Episode: "The Hoots"	
1974	Smile Jenny, You're Dead	Lt. Humphrey Kenner	TV film	
1974	The Missiles of October	Nikita Khrushchev	TV film	
1976	The American Parade	William M Tweed	Episode: "Stop, Thief!"	
1977	Insight	Arnstein	Episode: "Arnstein's Miracle"	
1978	When the Boat Comes In	Himself (host)	US broadcast	
1978	Verna: USO Girl	Eddie	TV film	
1980	Power	Jack Eisenstadt	TV film	
1980	The Greatest Man in the World	Conklin	TV film	
1983	Archie Bunker's Place	Abe Rabinowitz	Episode: "The Promotion"	
1983	Masquerade	General Breznin	Pilot episode	
1984	American Playhouse	Critic	Episode: "The Cafeteria"	

==== Doctor Who ====
Da Silva provided linking narration for North American broadcasts of Doctor Who, providing continuity announcements for episodes from season 12 through season 15, ostensibly to help North American audiences get acclimatized to the nature of serial storytelling, which was then uncommon on non-soap-operatic television in the United States and Canada. His narration accompanied the earliest runs of Doctor Who as broadcast on American PBS stations and Canadian broadcasters like TVOntario during the 1970s and early 1980s. Typically, after Doctor Who had been run on a station for a while, the linking narration was removed as unnecessary. Nevertheless, the announcements were so familiar a part of some viewers' experience of Doctor Who that they became a standard extra feature on BBC DVD releases of early Tom Baker serials.

== Stage credits ==
Date		Title	Role(s)	Venue(s)	Other notes	Ref.
Opening	Closing	Title	Role(s)	Venue(s)	Other notes	Ref.
04/21/1930	05/1930	Romeo and Juliet	Apothecary	Civic Repertory Theatre, New York		
10/06/1930	unknown	The Green Cockatoo	Scaevola	Civic Repertory Theatre, New York		
10/06/1930	11/1930	Romeo and Juliet	Apothecary	Civic Repertory Theatre, New York		
10/20/1930	11/1930	Siegfried	Mr. Patchkoffer, Schumann	Civic Repertory Theatre, New York		
12/01/1930	01/1931	Alison's House	Hodges	Civic Repertory Theatre, New York		
01/26/1931	03/1931	Camille	Guest	Civic Repertory Theatre, New York		
05/11/1931	05/31/1931	Alison's House	Hodges	Ritz Theatre, New York		
Oct 26, 1932	Oct 1932	Liliom	Wolf Beifeld	Civic Repertory Theatre, New York		
Nov 14, 1932	Nov 1932	Dear Jane	Dr. Samuel Johnson	Civic Repertory Theatre, New York		
Dec 12, 1932	Dec 1933	Alice in Wonderland	Cook, White Knight	Civic Repertory Theatre, New York		
March 6, 1933	April 1933	The Cherry Orchard	Stationmaster	New Amsterdam Theatre, New York		
Dec 10, 1934	Mar 1935	Sailors of Cattaro	Sepp Kriz	Civic Repertory Theatre, New York		
Mar 20, 1935	June 1935	Black Pitt	Hansy McCulloh	Civic Repertory Theatre, New York		
Nov 4, 1937	June 1938	Golden Boy	Lewis	Belasco Theatre, New York		
Jan 3, 1938	April 1938	The Cradle Will Rock	Larry Foreman	Windsor Theatre, New York		
Feb 19, 1938	May 1938	Casey Jones	Old Man	Fulton Theatre, New York		
Oct 15, 1938	Dec 1939	Abe Lincoln in Illinois	Jack Armstrong	Plymouth Theatre, New York		
Nov 2, 1939	Nov 4, 1939	Summer Night	Speed	St. James Theatre, New York		
Jan 22, 1940	Apr 13, 1940	Two On An Island	The Sightseeing Guide	Broadhurst Theatre, New York		
Jan 22, May 31, 1943	May 29, 1948	Oklahoma!	Jud Fry	St. James Theatre, New York		
April 9, 1946	unknown	Shootin' Star	Saloon proprietor, Sheriff	Shubert Theatre, Philadelphia		
Dec 26, 1947	Feb 7, 1948	The Cradle Will Rock	data-sort-value="" style="background: var(--background-color-interactive, #ececec); color: var(--color-base, inherit); vertical-align: middle; text-align: center; " class="table-na" | —N/a	Mansfield Theatre, Nerw York	As director	
Dec 26, 1947	Feb 7, 1948	The Cradle Will Rock	data-sort-value="" style="background: var(--background-color-interactive, #ececec); color: var(--color-base, inherit); vertical-align: middle; text-align: center; " class="table-na" | —N/a	Broadway Theatre, New York	As director	
Oct 18, 1950	Oct 28, 1950	Burning Bright	Friend Ed	Broadhurst Theatre, New York		
Nov 23, 1954	Jan 2, 1955	Sandhog	—N/a	Phoenix Theatre, New York	As producer	
Nov 4, 1956	Nov 25, 1956	Diary of a Scoundrel	Neel Fedoseitch Mamaev	Phoenix Theatre		
Oct 24, 1957	Feb 22, 1958	Compulsion	Horn	Ambassador Theatre, New York		
Nov 23, 1959	Oct 28, 1961	Fiorello!	Ben Marino	Broadhurst Theatre, New York		
Nov 23, 1959	Oct 28, 1961	Fiorello!	Ben Marino	Broadway Theatre, New York		
Sept 28, 1961	May 13, 1962	Purlie Victorious	data-sort-value="" style="background: var(--background-color-interactive, #ececec); color: var(--color-base, inherit); vertical-align: middle; text-align: center; " class="table-na" | —N/a	Cort Theatre, New York		
Sept 28, 1961	May 13, 1962	Purlie Victorious	data-sort-value="" style="background: var(--background-color-interactive, #ececec); color: var(--color-base, inherit); vertical-align: middle; text-align: center; " class="table-na" | —N/a	Longacre Theatre, New York		
Jan 10, 1962	Mar 10, 1962	Romulus	Ottaker	Music Box Theatre, New York		
Dec 12, 1962	Dec 15, 1962	In the Counting House	Max Hartman	Biltmore Theater, New York		
Feb 28, 1963	Jul 10, 1963	Dear Me, The Sky is Falling	Paul Hirsch	Music Box Theatre, New York		
Oct 14, 1963	Oct 19, 1963	The Advocate	—N/a	ANTA Playhouse, New York	As director	
Nov 8, 1964	Jan 7, 1965	The Cradle Will Rock	—N/a	Theatre Four, New York	As director	
Nov 10, 1965	Apr 16, 1966	The Zulu and the Zayda	—N/a	Cort Theatre, New York	As writer	
Dec 06, 1966	Dec 31, 1966	My Sweet Charlie	—N/a	Longacre Theatre, New York	As director	
May 5, 1966	May 29, 1966	Galileo Galilei	—N/a	Goodman Theater, Chicago	As guest director	
Jul 06, 1967	Nov 12, 1967	The Unknown Soldier and His Wife	Archbishop	Vivian Beaumont Theater, New York		
Jul 06, 1967	Nov 12, 1967	The Unknown Soldier and His Wife	Archbishop	George Abbott Theater, New York		
Mar 16, 1969	Feb 13, 1972	1776	Benjamin Franklin	46th Street Theatre, New York		
Mar 16, 1969	Feb 13, 1972	1776	Benjamin Franklin	St. James Theatre, New York		
Mar 16, 1969	Feb 13, 1972	1776	Benjamin Franklin	Majestic Theatre, New York		
Feb 11, 1982	Feb 28, 1982	The World of Sholom Aleichem	—N/a	Rialto Theatre, New York	Conceived by	

== CBS Radio Mystery Theater ==
From 1974 to 1977, da Silva was a regular player on CBS Radio Mystery Theater.

Year	Date	Title	Ep. No.
1974	July 31	"The Only Blood"	125
1974	Dec 5	"The Body Snatchers"	183
1974	Dec 24	"A Very Private Miracle"	191
1975	Jan 14	"Faith and the Faker"	205
1975	Feb 14	"The Shadow of the Past"	223
1975	Mar 20	"The Doppelganger"	242
1975	Apr 18	"A Challenge for the Dead"	259
1975	May 8	"Taken for Granite"	270
1975	June 6	"The Transformer"	287
1975	July 2	"Come Back with Me"	301
1975	Aug 5	"Hung Jury"	321
1975	Aug 19	"Welcome for a Dead Man"	329
1975	Sept 18	"The Coffin with the Golden Nails"	346
1975	Sept 28	"The Other Self "	354
1975	Oct 23	"The Sealed Room Murder"	366
1975	Nov 17	"The Moonlighter"	380
1975	Nov 28	"The Frammis"	387
1975	Dec 15	"Burn, Witch, Burn"	396
1976	Jan 19	"There's No Business Like"	418
1976	Feb 19	"Goodbye, Benjamin Flack"	434
1976	Apr 24	"The Prince of Evil"	475
1976	Aug 30	"The Night Shift"	511
1976	Oct 22	"Somebody Help Me!"	540
1976	Dec 14	"The Smoking Pistol"	565
1977	Jan 4	"This Breed Is Doomed"	577
1977	Feb 25	"Legend of Phoenix Hill"	607

== Awards and nominations ==
Institution	Year	Category	Work	Result	Ref.
British Academy Film Awards	1964	Best Foreign Actor	David and Lisa	Nominated	
Primetime Emmy Awards	1978	Outstanding Supporting Actor in a Comedy or Drama Special	Verna: USO Girl	Won	
Tony Awards	1960	Best Featured Actor in a Musical	Fiorello!	Nominated	

== Citations ==
=== References ===
- Buhle, Paul; Wagner, David (2004). Hide in Plain Sight: The Hollywood Blacklistees in Film and Television, 1950–2002. Palgrave Macmilla. ISBN 978-1-4039-6684-1.
- Erickson, Hal (2009). Encyclopedia of Television Law Shows. McFarland. ISBN 978-0-7864-3828-0.
- Frommer, Myrna Katz; Frommer, Harvey (2014). It Happened on Broadway: An Oral History of the Great White Way. Rowman & Littlefield. ISBN 978-1-58979-916-5.
- Gertel, Elliott (2003). Over the Top Judaism: Precedents and Trends in the Depiction of Jewish Beliefs and Observances in Film and Television. University Press of America. ISBN 978-0-7618-2624-8.
- Ghiglione, Loren (2008). CBS's Don Hollenbeck An Honest Reporter in the Age of McCarthyism. Columbia University Press. ISBN 978-0-231-51689-1.
- Heitland, Jon (1987). The Man from U.N.C.L.E. Book: The Behind-the-Scenes Story of a Television Classic. St. Martin's Griffin. ISBN 978-0-312-00052-3.
- Humphries, Reynold (2010). Hollywood's Blacklists: A Political and Cultural History. Edinburgh University Press. ISBN 978-0-7486-2456-0.
- Laster, Kathy; Breckweg, Krista; King, John (2000). The Drama of the Courtroom. Federation Press. ISBN 978-1-86287-339-1.
- Monush, Barry (1965). The Encyclopedia of Hollywood Film Actors. Applause Theatre & Cinema Books. ISBN 978-1-55783-551-2.
- Ryskind, Allen H. (2015). Hollywood Traitors: Blacklisted Screenwriters – Agents of Stalin, Allies of Hitler. Regnery History. ISBN 978-1-62157-206-0.
- Roberts, Jerry (2003). The Great American Playwrights on the Screen: A Critical Guide to Film, TV, Video and DVD. Applause Theatre & Cinema Books. ISBN 978-1-55783-512-3.
- Room, Adrian (2010). Dictionary of Pseudonyms. McFarland. ISBN 978-0-7864-5763-2.
- Rose, Philip (2004). You Can't Do That on Broadway!: A Raisin in the Sun and Other Theatrical Improbabilities. Limelight Editions. ISBN 978-0-87910-960-8.
- Sainer, Albert (1998). Zero Dances: A Biography of Zero Mostel. Limelight Editions. ISBN 978-0-87910-096-4.
- Shatner, William; Fisher, David (2008). Up Till Now: The Autobiography. St. Martin's Press. ISBN 978-0-312-37265-1.
- Suskin, Steven (2010). Show Tunes: The Songs, Shows, and Careers of Broadway's Major Composers. Oxford University Press. ISBN 978-0-19-531407-6.
- Terrace, Vincent (2011). Encyclopedia of Television Shows, 1925 through 2010, 2d ed. McFarland. ISBN 978-0-7864-6477-7.
- Terrace, Vincente (2013). Television Specials: 5,336 Entertainment Programs, 1936–2012, 2d ed. McFarland. ISBN 978-0-7864-7444-8.
