= Eando Binder =

American duo of sci-fi authors

Earl Andrew Binder and Otto Binder
- Born: 1904, 1911; United States
- Died: United States
- Writing career
- Pen name: Eando Binder
- Language: English
- Genre: Science fiction

Eando Binder (/ˈbɪndər/) is a pen name used by two mid-20th-century science fiction authors, Earl Andrew Binder (1904–1966) and his brother Otto Binder (1911–1974). The name is derived from their first initials (E and O Binder). Under the Eando name, the Binders wrote some published science fiction, including stories featuring a heroic robot named Adam Link. The first Adam Link story, published in 1939, is titled "I, Robot".

== Overview ==
By 1939, Otto had taken over all of the writing, leaving Earl to act as his literary agent. Under his own name, Otto wrote for the Captain Marvel line of comic books published by Fawcett Comics (1941–1953) and the Superman line for Detective Comics (1948–1969), as well as numerous other publishers, with credited stories numbering over 4400. The pen-name Eando Binder is also credited with over 160 comic book stories.

Otto Binder was born in Chicago and moved to New York in 1936. He worked as a literary agent for Otis Adelbert Kline for a year, then became a free-lance writer. He sold his first story in 1930 and 129 more during the next decade. He lived in Englewood, New Jersey, from 1944 until he moved to Chestertown in 1968. Otto Binder attended Crane College in Chicago and told Amazing Stories he was once "an amateur chemist with a home laboratory."

He wrote comic-book scripts, novels, and magazine articles. His books included Riddles of Astronomy, Careers in Space, and Mankind, Child of the Stars.

He was a member of the Journal of American Literature, the American Rocket Society, the American Interplanetary Society, the National Space Flight Association, and the Aerospace Writers Association.

He died October 14, 1974, and was survived by his wife, Ione; a brother, Jack, and two sisters, Marie Hackstock of Chicago and Teresa Samuelson of Estes Park, Colorado.

Earl Binder worked as a mechanical parts inspector for a "large industrial concern" during the 1930s.

== Bibliography ==
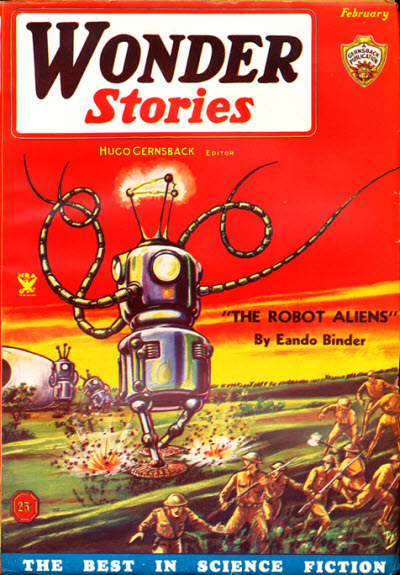
Binder's The Robot Aliens was the cover story in the February 1935 issue of Wonder Stories

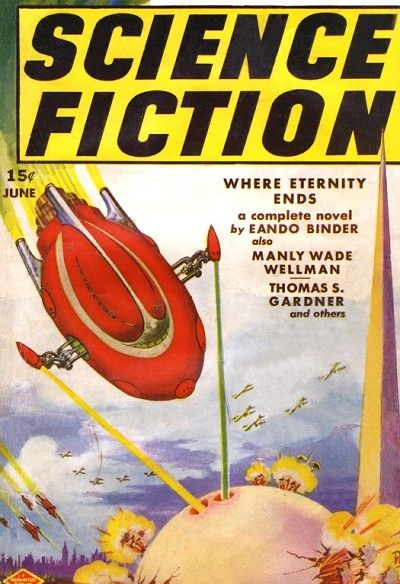
The Binder novelette Where Eternity Ends was cover-featured on the June 1939 issue of Science Fiction, illustrated by Frank R. Paul

- The First Martian, Amazing Stories, Oct 1932
- Set your Course by the Stars, Astounding Stories, May 1935
- The Time Entity, Astounding Stories, Oct 1936
- Conquest of Life, Thrilling Wonder Stories, Aug 1937 (Anton York)
- Via Etherline, Thrilling Wonder Stories, Oct 1937 (Via)
- Queen of the Skies, Astounding Stories, Nov 1937
- Life Eternal, Thrilling Wonder Stories, Feb 1938 (Anton York)
- Via Asteroid, Thrilling Wonder Stories, Feb 1938 (Via)
- Via Death, Thrilling Wonder Stories, Aug 1938 (Via)
- "I, Robot", Amazing Stories, Jan 1939 (Adam Link)
- The Impossible World, Startling Stories, Mar 1939 (reprinted in The Impossible World)
- Where Eternity Ends (complete novel), Science Fiction, Jun 1939
- The Trial of Adam Link, Amazing Stories, Jul 1939 (Adam Link)
- The Man Who Saw Too Late, Fantastic Adventures, Sep 1939
- Lords of Creation, Argosy, Sep 1939, serialized in six parts, book publication 1949
- Via Venus, Thrilling Wonder Stories, Oct 1939 (Via)
- The Three Eternals, Thrilling Wonder Stories, Dec 1939 (Anton York)
- One Thousand Miles Below, Planet Stories, Winter 1940 (reprinted as Get off my World!)
- Adam Link in Business, Amazing Stories, Jan 1940 (Adam Link)
- Via Pyramid, Thrilling Wonder Stories, Jan 1940 (Via)
- Adam Link's Vengeance, Amazing Stories, Feb 1940 (Adam Link)
- Son of the Stars, Famous Fantastic Mysteries, Feb 1940
- Via Sun, Thrilling Wonder Stories, Mar 1940 (Via)
- Adam Link, Robot Detective, Amazing Stories, May 1940 (Adam Link)
- Adam Link, Champion Athlete, Amazing Stories, Jul 1940 (Adam Link)
- The Secret of Anton York, Thrilling Wonder Stories, Aug 1940 (Anton York)
- Via Mercury, Thrilling Wonder Stories, Oct 1940 (Via)
- Via Catacombs, Thrilling Wonder Stories, Nov 1940 (Via)
- Via Intelligence, Thrilling Wonder Stories, Dec 1940 (Via)
- The Teacher from Mars, Thrilling Wonder Stories, Feb 1941
- Wanderer of Little Land, Fantastic Adventures, Jun 1941 (Little People)
- Via Jupiter, Thrilling Wonder Stories, Feb 1942 (Via)
- Adam Link Saves the World, Amazing Stories, Apr 1942 (Adam Link)
- Enslaved Brains, Fantastic Story Quarterly, Winter 1951
- Iron Man, Future Science Fiction #28, 1955
- Captain Video, Fawcett, 1951
- Adam Link — Robot, Paperback Library, 1965 (Adam Link)
- Anton York, Immortal, Belmont, 1965 (Anton York)
- Puzzle of the Space Pyramids, Curtis, 1971 (reprinting the Via stories)
- Get off my world!, Curtis, 1971 (reprinting One Thousand Miles Below)
- All in Good Time, Signs and Wonders, ed. Roger Elwood, Revell, 1972
- The Mind from Outer Space, Curtis Books, 1972
- Any Resemblance to Magic, The Long Night of Waiting, ed. Roger Elwood, Aurora, 1974
- Better Dumb Than Dead, Journey to Another Star and Other Stories, ed. Roger Elwood, Lerner, 1974
- The Missing World, The Missing World and Other Stories, ed. Roger Elwood, Lerner, 1974
- The Avengers Battle The Earth-Wrecker, A Bantam Book, 1967
