= Otto Binder =

American writer (1911–1974)

- Born: Otto Oscar Binder; August 26, 1911 Bessemer, Michigan, U.S.
- Died: October 13, 1974 (aged 63) Chestertown, New York, U.S.
- Area: Writer
- Pseudonym: Eando Binder
- Notable works: Action Comics; Adventure Comics; Captain Marvel Adventures; Mary Marvel; Superboy; Supergirl; Superman; "I, Robot" (1939)
- Awards: Kirby Hall of Fame (1999); Eisner Hall of Fame (2004); Bill Finger Award (2010)
- Relatives: Jack Binder (brother); Earl Andrew Binder (brother)

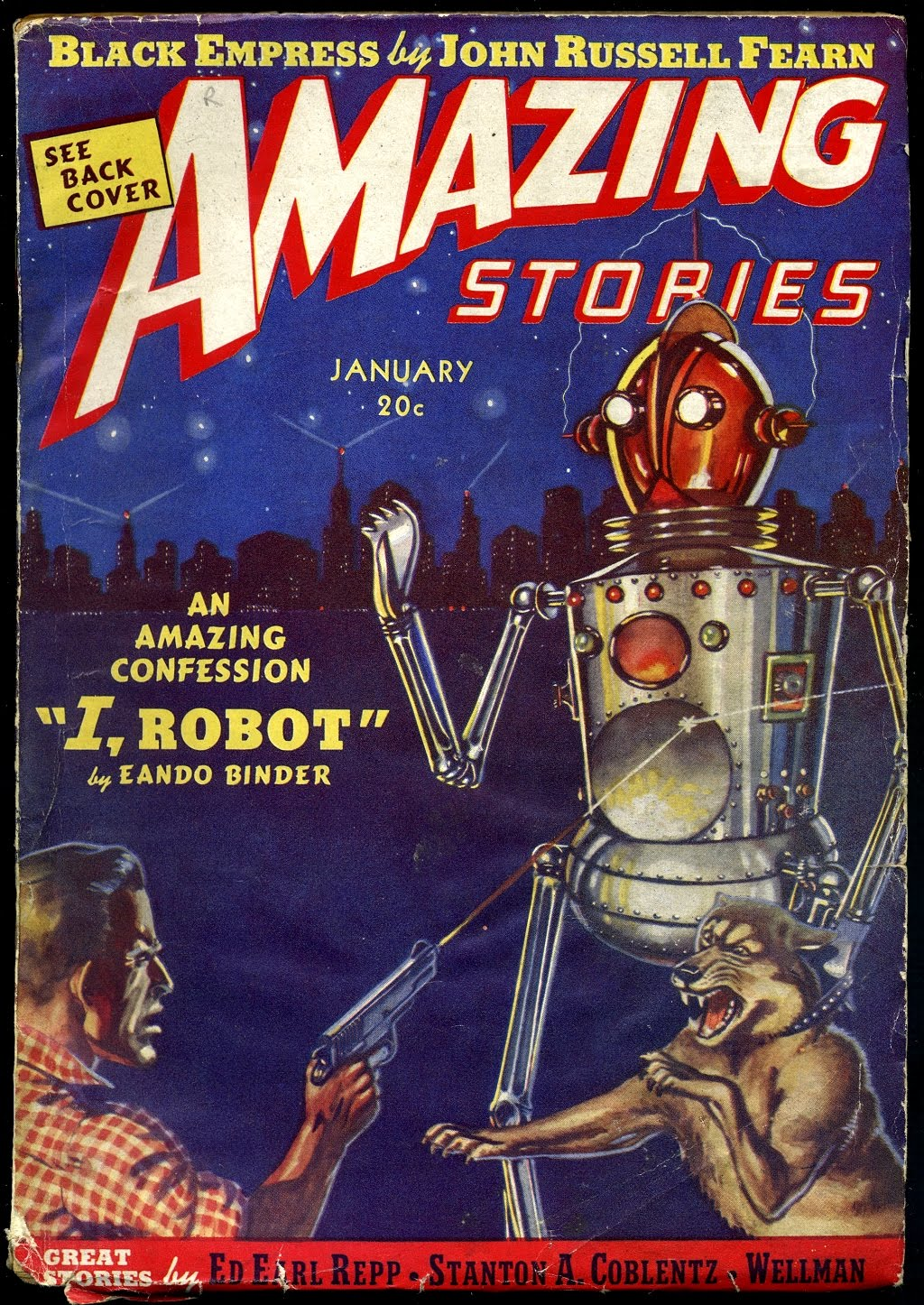
Binder's "I, Robot" was the cover story in the January 1939 issue of Amazing Stories.

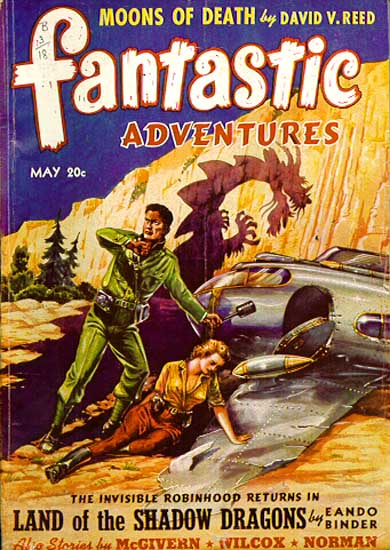
Binder's novella Land of the Shadow Dragons was the cover story in the May 1941 issue of Fantastic adventures.

Otto Oscar Binder (/ˈbɪndər/; August 26, 1911 – October 13, 1974) was an American author of science fiction and non-fiction books and stories, and comic books. He is best known as the co-creator of Supergirl and for his many scripts for Captain Marvel Adventures and other stories involving the entire superhero Marvel Family. He was prolific in the comic book field and is credited with writing over 4,400 stories across a variety of publishers under his own name, as well as more than 160 stories under the pen-name Eando Binder.

== Biography ==
=== Early life and career ===
Otto Oscar Binder was born on August 26, 1911, in Bessemer, Michigan, the youngest of six children of a German Lutheran family that had emigrated from Austria the year before. They settled in Chicago in 1922, during a period rich with science fiction, which enthralled Binder and his brother Earl. The two began writing in partnership and sold their first story, "The First Martian" to Amazing Stories in 1930; it saw publication in 1932 under the pen name "Eando Binder" ("E" and "O" Binder).

Not earning enough as a writer, Binder and his brother worked at many jobs. Earl found employment at an iron works. In late December 1935, Otto Binder began working for Otis Adelbert Kline as a literary agent in charge of Kline's New York City office most prominently marketing the stories of Robert E. Howard, although insufficient business during this Great Depression era forced Kline to close his company after a year and a half. At the time of Otto's move to New York City, Earl Binder dissolved the writing partnership, and all new material produced under the name of Eando Binder from January 1936 on, was solely the work of Otto Binder. Concurrent with his agent work, Binder was writing for Mort Weisinger, editor of Thrilling Wonder Stories, and Ray Palmer, editor of Amazing, for the latter of whom he created the Adam Link series.

=== Fawcett Comics and Captain Marvel ===
Binder entered comics in 1939 on the heels of his artist brother, Jack, who moved to New York to work at the studio of Harry "A" Chesler, one of that era's "packagers" who provided outsourced content for publishers entering the new medium of comic books. The following year, magazine publisher Fawcett Publications began its Fawcett Comics line, and Binder started writing the exploits of such characters as Captain Venture, Golden Arrow, Bulletman, and El Carim. After a year, editor Ed Herron had Binder tackle Fawcett's most prominent character, the superhero Captain Marvel. He soon wrote for the spin-off features starring Captain Marvel, Jr. and Mary Marvel, the latter of whom he co-created with Marc Swayze.

Binder spent from 1941 to 1953 with Fawcett, writing "986 stories ... out of 1,743, over half the entire Marvel Family saga", per comic-book writer-editor E. Nelson Bridwell. His first Captain Marvel writing was the "Dime Action Book" novel Return of the Scorpion, featuring the villain from the 1941 Republic serial The Adventures of Captain Marvel. His first Captain Marvel comic-book story was "Captain Marvel Saves the King" in Captain Marvel Adventures #9 (April 1942). He wrote for numerous other Fawcett features, as well as many two-page text fillers that were required in comics in order to be eligible for magazine postal rates. His text stories in Captain Marvel Adventures, under the "Eando" pseudonym, starred Lieutenant Jon Jarl of the Space Patrol. During his time at Fawcett, Binder co-created with Swayze and C. C. Beck such characters as Mary Marvel, Uncle Dudley, Mr. Tawky Tawny, Black Adam, and Mr. Mind, as well as two of Doctor Sivana's four children: the evil teens Thaddeus Sivana Jr. and daughter Georgia. Binder and Beck unsuccessfully attempted to launch a newspaper comic strip featuring Mr. Tawky Tawny in 1953.

=== Other comics work ===
Binder left Fawcett when the company shut down its comic book division in 1953, but found no shortage of work. For Timely Comics, the 1940s company that would evolve into Marvel Comics, he [co-]created Captain Wonder, the Young Allies, Tommy Tyme and the patriotically themed superheroine Miss America, and wrote for stories starring Captain America, the Human Torch, the Sub-Mariner, the Destroyer, the Whizzer, and the All-Winners Squad.

For Quality Comics, Binder co-created Kid Eternity, and wrote Blackhawk, Doll Man, Uncle Sam and Black Condor stories. For MLJ Comics (subsequently known as Archie Comics), he wrote stories starring Steel Sterling, the Shield, the Hangman, and the Black Hood. At Gold Key Comics, Binder co-created Mighty Samson and other characters. His science fiction for EC Comics includes "Lost in Space", illustrated by Al Williamson, in Weird Science-Fantasy #28 (March–April 1955).

=== DC Comics ===
In 1948, Binder began working for DC Comics, then known as National Periodical Publications, swiftly creating Merry, Girl of 1,000 Gimmicks, in the feature "Star-Spangled Kid", whose place Merry soon took in Star-Spangled Comics.

He then moved on to his best-known DC work, the Superman group of titles, including launching the Superman's Pal Jimmy Olsen series in 1954. Binder and artist Al Plastino collaborated on the Superboy story in Adventure Comics #247 (April 1958) that introduced the Legion of Super-Heroes, a teen superhero team from the future that eventually became one of DC's most popular features. Binder and Plastino debuted the supervillain Brainiac and the Bottle City of Kandor in Action Comics #242 (July 1958) and co-created Supergirl in Action Comics #252 (May 1959). With various artist collaborators, he co-created Krypto the Super Dog, the Phantom Zone, and the supporting characters Lucy Lane, Beppo the Super Monkey, and Titano the Super Ape. In the first issue of Superman's Pal Jimmy Olsen, he introduced Jimmy Olsen's signal-watch, and in #31, Jimmy's Elastic Lad identity. He wrote the Lois Lane feature in Showcase #9 (Aug. 1957) which served as a tryout for the character's own series.

DC writer-editor E. Nelson Bridwell credits Binder as creating the first "Imaginary Tale, for Lois Lane", and of writing "most of the early" Bizarro stories, including at least the first "Tales of the Bizarro World" feature. The character's first comic book appearance was in Superboy #68 (Oct. 1958) by Binder and artist George Papp and Bizarro World was introduced in Action Comics #263 (April 1960). Binder scripted what Bridwell calls the "classic [storyline] 'Superman's Return to Krypton.'" His last Superman story was "The Cage of Doom" in Action Comics #377 (June 1969).

Binder was featured in a story in the first issue of Shazam, DC Comics' 1970s revival of the original Captain Marvel. The Binder character, drawn by C. C. Beck, meets a young Billy Batson and is astonished that the boy, who has been missing for 20 years, is still a kid.

=== Books ===
Binder was a proponent of the ancient astronauts theory, and a believer in extraterrestrial life. Binder's theory was that human beings are "homo hybrid", an "interstellar crossbreed" (half human, half extraterrestrial). He first discussed this hypothesis in his 1968 book Flying Saucers Are Watching Us (later called Unsolved Mysteries of the Past, Tower Publications; reissue edition, 1970). He wrote Mankind Child of the Stars with Max Flindt in 1974, discussing the concept of "astroevolution". Erich von Däniken wrote a foreword for the book, which was revised and reprinted in 1999. He wrote extensively about UFOs in magazines, including articles detailing the experiences of claimed UFO contactee Ted Owens.

=== New works ===
Binder's previously unpublished 1953 story, "The Unwanted", has been adapted as a graphic novel by Robert L. Reiner. Published in early 2023 by Fantagraphics, the manuscript had been given to Reiner in the late sixties when he was a teenage fanzine editor and publisher. The story describes a census to be taken in the distant future. A civilization of "Mastermen" rule a galactic empire and visit this planet to determine if it is worthy to join an imperial congress. Membership means access to technology and protection. In evaluating this particular planet, the Mastermen are shocked by what they find. The book is illustrated by artist Angelo Torres and sculptor and speed painter Stefan Koidl.

=== Final years and death ===
Binder became editor of Space World magazine, a move that ended in bankruptcy in the early 1960s. As he recalled in 1974:

I'm far from retired, simply because I can't afford it. All the money I made from the Marvels and had saved up went down the drain when, in 1960, I invested as junior partner in publishing Space World, a magazine about astronomics ... I think it was a good job I did as editor-in-chief—although the public stayed away from it in droves ... A loss every month on low sales. The mag lasted some 16 issues, during which time Bill Woolfolk and I had put in more money—I mortgaged my house—all paid up by Cap—and borrowed, etc., but we never got the lucky break. So that left me without money reserves, and it was back to the comics until 1967, when my daughter—our only child—was killed by a car at age 14. For reasons difficult to explain, my wife and I moved from Englewood, New Jersey, to upstate New York where Jack lived. I was pretty broken up and found it difficult to write again up here, but went back to sci-fi, this time as the market hit.

Otto Binder's daughter Mary, had been on her way to school one morning when a car jumped the curb, went into the driveway in front of the school, and killed her. As film producer and comics historian Michael Uslan, a family friend, recalled, "Otto never recovered. His wife never recovered. She had a breakdown, and Otto started drinking, and eventually he dropped dead of a heart attack. And the three of them were gone, like in a flash." Binder recalled in a 1972 history of comics, that after his daughter's death

... we finally made up our minds to 'start a new life.' When we moved to upstate New York in 1969, I quit DC and comics entirely and went back into the sci-fi paperback field. Curtis Books bought seven of my books in a row, including a few oldies, and Belmont issued another half a dozen. I began selling 'gothics' besides a batch of flying saucer books and articles for Saga magazine.

In 1973, Binder worked for Vincent Fago's Pendulum Press, adapting classic science-fiction stories into comic book format, including Frankenstein, The Invisible Man, The Time Machine, 20,000 Leagues Under the Sea, and The Mysterious Island.

He died in Chestertown, New York, on October 13, 1974, leaving behind, counted Bridwell, "almost 50,000 pages of comics" comprising "over 1,300 scripts for Fawcett" and "more than 2,000 for 20 other publishers", including "some 93 heroes in 198 magazines".

== Awards and legacy ==
Binder was posthumously inducted into the Jack Kirby Hall of Fame in 1999 and the Will Eisner Hall of Fame in 2004. He was the posthumous recipient of the Bill Finger Award in 2010.

Binder is referenced in the first episode of the 2015 television series Supergirl as the title character prevents a crippled jet from crashing into the "Otto Binder bridge". The first episode of the third season of My Adventures with Superman, which introduces the series' version of Bizarro, depicts him being raised by a scientist named Dr. George Otto Binder, a combination of the names of Binder and Bizarro co-creator George Papp.

== Bibliography ==
=== Archie Comics ===
- Black Hood Comics #10 (1944)
- Hangman Comics #5 (1943)
- Pep Comics #46 (1944)
- Top Notch Comics #1–3 (1939–1940)
- Zip Comics #44, 46 (1944)

=== DC Comics ===
- Action Comics #127–146, 182, 195, 200, 202, 204–260, 262–265, 267–268, 270–273, 317, 320, 323, 326, 331, 335–337, 341–342, 344, 349–353, 357, 359, 361–364, 367–369, 371–372, 374–377 (1948–1969)
- Adventure Comics #130–147, 201–204, 206, 210–211, 214–215, 217–222, 226–227, 229–231, 233–238, 241–242, 245–247, 249, 251, 255–257, 259–265, 276, 278–279, 282, 287, 289, 355 (1948–1967)
- Detective Comics #138–147, 150, 203–205, 207–224 (1948–1955)
- House of Mystery #32, 37, 181, 257 (1954–1978)
- Metal Men #30–32 (1968)
- Mystery in Space #19–23, 26–52, 54, 57–58. 108, 110 (1954–1966)
- Showcase #9–10 (Lois Lane) (1957)
- Star-Spangled Comics #81, 85–87, 89–90, 94 (1948–1949)
- Strange Adventures #42, 44–54, 57, 59–66, 71–72, 75–78, 80–92, 94–100, 103, 108–110, 188, 193, 200, 202 (1954–1967)
- Superboy #37–38, 40, 42–64, 66–78, 80–81, 85, 92, 99, 114–115, 118, 121–122, 124–127, 130–133, 136, 139–140, 144–145 (1954–1968)
- Superman #97, 109, 111, 114–115, 117, 121–124, 126–127, 129–134, 138–140, 142–143, 146, 173, 176–177, 179, 184, 186, 188–189, 192, 194, 196, 205, 215 (1955–1969)
- Superman's Girl Friend, Lois Lane #1–5, 14, 17–19, 22–23, 27, 55–61, 71 (1958–1967)
- Superman's Pal Jimmy Olsen #1–37, 39–41, 44–48, 50–51, 84, 87–90, 98, 105, 112, 116–118 (1954–1969)
- World's Finest Comics #33–34, 37–44, 105–106, 108 (1948–1960)

=== EC Comics ===
- Crime SuspenStories #23, 25 (1954)
- Haunt of Fear #24–26 (1954)
- Valor #3 (1955)
- Vault of Horror #37 (1954)

=== Fawcett Comics ===
- America's Greatest Comics #2, 6, 8 (1942–1943)
- Bulletman #3, 9–10, 14 (1942–1946)
- Captain Marvel Adventures #8–11, 14, 16–18, 20–58, 61–76, 78–97, 100–150 (1942–1953)
- Captain Marvel Jr. #1–18, 21, 23, 28–29, 35–36, 38–63, 65, 68, 70–74, 76–90, 93, 95–96, 101–102 (1942–1951)
- Destination Moon #1 (1950)
- Ibis the Invincible #1–2 (1942–1943)
- Marvel Family #1–4, 7, 10, 53 (1945–1950)
- Mary Marvel #1–8, 10–24, 26–28 (1945–1948)
- Master Comics #16, 18–19, 21–22, 25, 33, 40 (1941–1943)
- Whiz Comics #21–22, 27–28, 39 (1941–1943)

=== Gold Key Comics ===
- Doctor Solar, Man of the Atom #7 (1964)

=== Marvel Comics ===
- All Winners Comics #21 (1947)
- Captain America Comics #8–9, 12, 15, 18, 23, 32, 35, 37–40, 62 (1941–1947)
- Kid Komics #1, 4–5 (1943–1944)
- Marvel Classics Comics #2, 4, 11, 13 (1976)
- Marvel Mystery Comics #49–66, 70–72 (1943–1946)
- Young Allies #12–13, 18–20 (1944–1946)

=== Milson Comics ===
- Fatman, The Human Flying Saucer #1–3 (1967)

=== Quality Comics ===
- Doll Man #5 (1943)
- National Comics #27 (Uncle Sam) (1942)

=== Warren ===
- Creepy #2, 4, 6–9, 12–13, 15 (1965–1967)
- Eerie #2 (1966)

=== Novels ===
- Lords of Creation (1949)
- Adam Link—Robot (1965)
- Anton York, Immortal (1965)
- Enslaved Brains (1965)
- The Avengers Battle the Earth-Wrecker (1967)
- What We Really Know about Flying Saucers (1967)
