= Weird Science-Fantasy =

Publication information
- Publisher: EC Comics
- Schedule: Quarterly(1954)/Bimonthly(1955)
- Format: Anthology
- Publication date: March 1954 - May/June 1955
- No. of issues: 7

Creative team
- Created by: William Gaines; Al Feldstein

Weird Science-Fantasy is an American science fiction-fantasy anthology comic that was part of the EC Comics line in the early 1950s. Over a 14-month span, the comic ran for seven issues, starting in March 1954 with issue #23 and ending with issue #29 in May/June 1955.

== Origin ==
The comic, published by Bill Gaines and edited by Al Feldstein, was a merger of two previous bi-monthly titles, Weird Science and Weird Fantasy, which ran from 1950 to 1953, both ending at issue #22. Because of the losses suffered from those two comics, Gaines and Feldstein combined the two into a single comic, published quarterly and priced at 15 cents. The price would be lowered back down to 10 cents after the first two issues. The comic reverted to a bi-monthly schedule with issue #27 in January/February 1955. In the summer of 1955, there was yet another title change as Weird Science-Fantasy became Incredible Science Fiction for the final four issues.

== Artists and writers ==
Cover illustrations were by Feldstein, Wally Wood, Al Williamson and Frank Frazetta. Artists who drew stories for this EC title were Feldstein, Wood, Williamson, Frazetta, Joe Orlando, Bernard Krigstein, Angelo Torres, George Evans, Reed Crandall and Jack Kamen. Writers included Feldstein, Gaines, Harlan Ellison (who contributed a single story in issue 24), Otto Binder, Jack Oleck, and Carl Wessler.

The final issue featured a cover by Frank Frazetta originally intended for a Famous Funnies cover illustrating Buck Rogers, but it was considered too violent for that comic book. Gaines bought the rights to use the cover (the only instance at EC where Gaines bought only the rights to the art, and not the art itself), and it was used with some minor revisions. The cover was later described by publisher Russ Cochran as "the most outstanding cover ever put on a comic book".

== Stories and themes ==
Issue 26 was a special issue about real reported encounters with flying saucers. Feldstein worked with Major Donald Keyhoe, a former marine pilot who was considered the leading popular writer on the subject at the time. With an emphasis on moral messages and retributive justice when dealing with both current social issues and science-fantasy, some comics were called 'preachies'. Themes of mechanical metaphors, to defamiliarize the reader with concepts of work, ownership, and generation of wealth were used to talk about race through the genera conventions of robots and aliens.

== Influences and adaptations ==
As with the other EC comics edited by Feldstein, the stories in this comic were primarily based on Gaines reading a large number of science fiction stories and using them to develop "springboards" from which he and Feldstein could launch new stories. Specific story influences that have been identified include the following:

- "Fair Trade" (issue 23) - Stephen Vincent Benét's "By the Waters of Babylon"
- "Adaptability" (issue 27) - Robert A. Heinlein's Universe
- "The Inferiors" (issue 28) - Murray Leinster's "The Lost Race"

Other stories were authorized adaptations, sometimes with the active participation of the original author. Otto Binder adapted some stories that he and his brother Earl had published in the 1940s. This included "The Teacher From Mars" (#24) and the three-part Adam Link series that appeared in issues 27 through 29.

"The Flying Machine" (#23) and "A Sound of Thunder" (#25) were official adaptations of short stories by Ray Bradbury.

== Issue guide ==
#	Date	Cover Artist	Story	Story Artist
23	March 1954	Wally Wood	The Children	Wally Wood
			Fish Story	Al Williamson
			The Flying Machine	Bernard Krigstein
			Fair Trade	Joe Orlando
24	June 1954	Al Feldstein	...For Posterity	Wally Wood
			The Teacher From Mars	Joe Orlando
			The Pioneer	Bernard Krigstein
			Upheaval!	Al Williamson
25	Sept 1954	Al Williamson	Flying Saucer Report	Wally Wood
			A Sound of Thunder	Al Williamson
			Bellyful	Bernard Krigstein
			Harvest	Joe Orlando
26	Dec 1954	Al Feldstein	Special UFO Issue	Wally Wood
				Joe Orlando
				Reed Crandall
				George Evans
27	Jan/Feb 1955	Wally Wood	Adaptability	Wally Wood
			Close Shave	Reed Crandall
			4th Degree	Jack Kamen
			I, Robot	Joe Orlando
28	March/April 1955	Al Feldstein	The Inferiors	Wally Wood
			Lost in Space	Al Williamson
			Round Trip	Jack Kamen
			The Trial of Adam Link	Joe Orlando
29	May/June 1955	Frank Frazetta	The Chosen One	Wally Wood
			Vicious Circle	Al Williamson
			Genesis	Reed Crandall
			Adam Link in Business	Joe Orlando
