= No Place Like Earth =

1951 science-fiction novelette by John Wyndham

- First edition
- Author: John Wyndham
- Cover artist: Allen Koszowski
- Language: English
- Genre: Science fiction
- Publisher: Darkside Press
- Publication date: 2003
- Publication place: United States
- Media type: Print ()
- ISBN: 978-0-9740589-0-0

No Place Like Earth (ISBN 978-0-9740589-0-0) is a collection of science fiction stories (ten short stories and six novelettes) by British writer John Wyndham, published in July 2003 by Darkside Press.

== Contents ==
- "Derelict of Space" (1939), novelette, as by John Beynon, also published in Wanderers of Time
- "Time to Rest" (1949), Bert #1 series, also published in The Seeds of Time
- "No Place Like Earth" (1951), novelette, as by John Beynon, Bert #2 series, also published in Exiles on Asperus
- "In Outer Space There Shone a Star" (1965)
- "But a Kind of Ghost" (1957)
- "The Cathedral Crypt" (1935), as by John Beynon Harris
- "A Life Postponed" (1968), novelette
- "Technical Slip" (1949), as by John Beynon Harris, also published in Jizzle
- "Una", novelette, variant of "The Perfect Creature" (1937), also published in Jizzle
- "It's a Wise Child" (1962)
- "Pillar to Post" (1951), novelette, also published in The Seeds of Time
- "The Stare" (1932)
- "Time Stops Today" (1953), novelette, variant of "Time Out", also published in The Infinite Moment
- "The Meddler" (1958)
- "Blackmoil"
- "A Long Spoon" (1960), also first published in Consider Her Ways and Others

== Adaptations ==
Based on short story "Time to Rest" and novelette "No Place on Earth":

- "No Place Like Earth" (1965), episode of the series Out of the Unknown, directed by Peter Potter

Based on short story "A Long Spoon":

- Ördögi szerencse (1978), TV movie directed by Vilmos Dobai
- "The Long Spoon" (1961), episode of the series Storyboard, directed by James MacTaggart

== See also ==
There is a compilation of short science fiction stories published under the same title: John Carnell's No Place like Earth: A Science Fiction Anthology (1954). It contains two stories by John Wyndham: "No Place like Earth" (as by John Beynon) and "Survival".
