= The Infinite Moment =

Science fiction short story

Cover of the first edition by Richard M. Powers.

The Infinite Moment is a collection of science fiction three short stories and three novellas/novelettes by British writer John Wyndham, published in Ballantine Books in 1961.

It is the United States edition of Consider Her Ways and Others, with two stories dropped and two others added.

== Contents ==
- "Consider Her Ways" (1956), novella
- "Odd"
- "How Do I Do" (1953)
- "Stitch in Time", variant of "A Stitch in Time"
- "Random Quest", novelette
- "Time Out" (1953), novelette, variant of "Time Stops Today"

== Summaries ==
"Consider Her Ways"
Jane, a woman from the present day, takes a drug thought to induce out-of-body experiences. She wakes up in the future, not as herself, but in a bloated body unknown to her.
"Odd"
an ordinary man profits from an extraordinary time paradox when he stops to help a man seemingly lost and confused, and then learns the reasons why.
"Stitch in Time"
an elderly lady reflecting on a lost love and, thanks to her sons' experiments with time, finally discovers the reason why her lover abandoned her so many years ago.
"Random Quest"
combines romance and parallel universes.

== Adaptations ==
Based on novella "Consider Her Ways":

- "Consider Her Ways" (1964), episode of the series The Alfred Hitchcock Hour, directed by Robert Stevens

Based on novelette "Random Quest":

- "Random Quest" (1969), episode of the series Out of the Unknown, directed by Christopher Barry
- Quest for Love (1971), film directed by Ralph Thomas
- Random Quest (1986), TV movie directed by Luke Watson
