= Consider Her Ways and Others =

Science fiction short story collection

- Cover of the first edition
- Author: John Wyndham
- Illustrator: None
- Cover artist: Rupert Smith
- Language: English
- Genre: Science fiction
- Publisher: Michael Joseph
- Publication date: 1961
- Publication place: United Kingdom
- Media type: Print (hardcover)
- Pages: 223
- ISBN: 978-0-7181-0066-7

Consider Her Ways and Others is a collection of science-fiction three short stories and three novelettes/novellas by John Wyndham, published in 1961.

== Contents ==
- "Consider Her Ways" (1956), novella
- "Odd"
- "Oh, Where, Now, Is Peggy MacRafferty?", novelette
- "A Stitch in Time", or "Stitch in Time"
- "Random Quest", novelette
- "A Long Spoon" (1960)

== Summaries ==
"Consider Her Ways"
Jane, a woman from the present day, takes a drug thought to induce out-of-body experiences. She wakes up in a future where there are no more men, in a bloated body unknown to her.
"Odd"
an ordinary man profits from an extraordinary time paradox when he stops to help a man seemingly lost and confused.
"Oh Where, Now, is Peggy MacRafferty?"
Peggy MacRafferty is a young Irish woman who appears on a quiz show and becomes a movie star, losing all that makes her special.
"A Stitch in Time"
an old woman discovers the reason why her lover abandoned her all those years ago thanks to her sons' experiments with time.
"Random Quest"
a physicist is temporarily taken to an alternate universe through a failed experiment, where he falls in love with a woman.
"A Long Spoon"
Stephen summons the demon Batruel by mistake and is unable to get rid of him.

== Adaptations ==
Based on novella "Consider Her Ways":

- "Consider Her Ways" (1964), episode of the series The Alfred Hitchcock Hour, directed by Robert Stevens

Based on novelette "Random Quest":

- "Random Quest" (1969), episode of the series Out of the Unknown, directed by Christopher Barry
- Quest for Love (1971), film directed by Ralph Thomas
- Random Quest (1986), TV movie directed by Luke Watson

Based on short story "A Long Spoon":

- "The Long Spoon" (1961), episode of the series Storyboard, directed by James MacTaggart
- Ördögi szerencse (1978), TV movie directed by Vilmos Dobai
