= John Wyndham =

English science fiction writer (1903–1969)

- Born: John Wyndham Parkes Lucas Beynon Harris; 10 July 1903; Dorridge, Warwickshire, England
- Died: 11 March 1969 (aged 65); Petersfield, Hampshire, England
- Occupation: Science fiction writer
- Spouse: Grace Wilson (m. 1963)

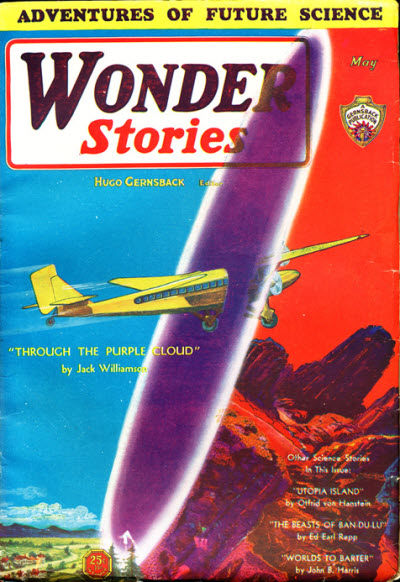
Wyndham's first published sf story, "Worlds to Barter", was published in the May 1931 issue of Wonder Stories, under his pen name John Beynon Harris.

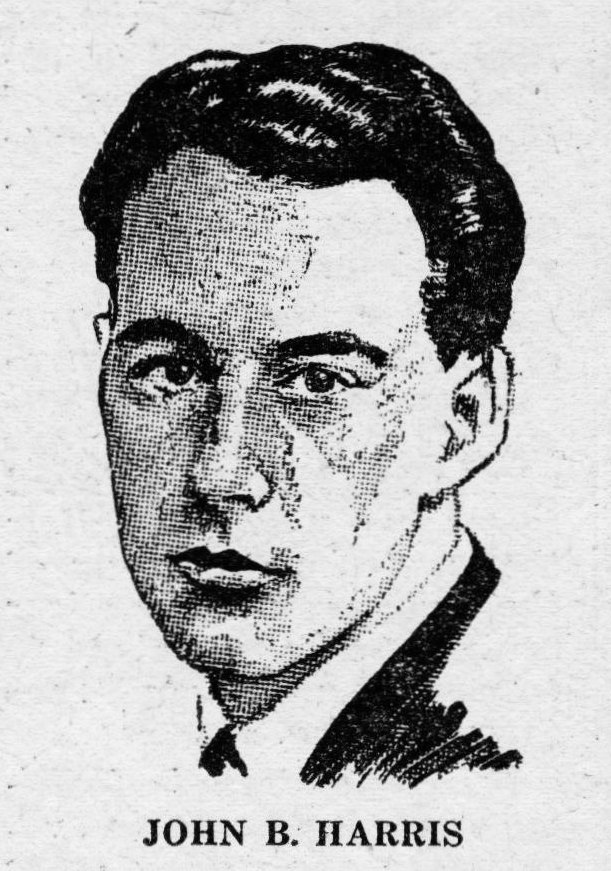
Wyndham/Harris as pictured in the May 1931 Wonder Stories

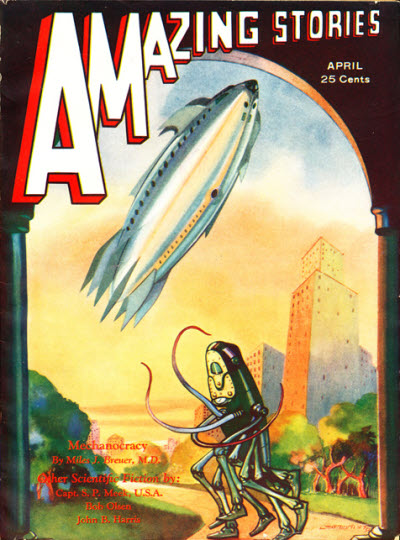
Wyndham's second story, "The Lost Machine", was cover-featured on the April 1932 issue of Amazing Stories, also under his Harris pen name

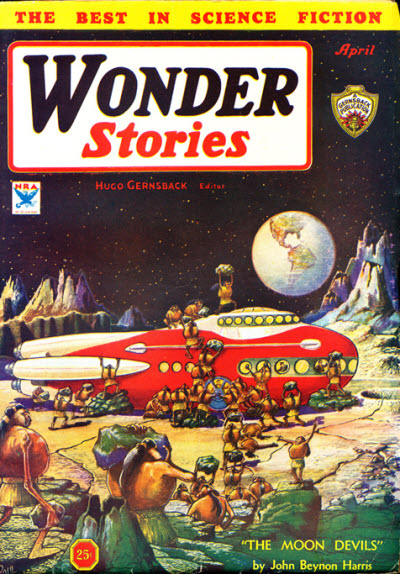
Wyndham's 1934 novelette "The Moon Devils" was the cover story for the April issue of Wonder Stories, also under the Harris pen name.

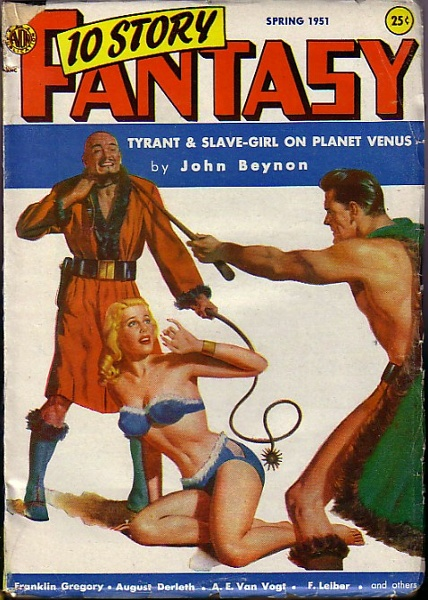
Wyndham's 1951 novelette "Tyrant and Slave-Girl on Planet Venus" was the cover story for the first and only issue of Ten Story Fantasy, under his pen name John Beynon.

John Wyndham Parkes Lucas Beynon Harris (/ˈwɪndəm/; 10 July 1903 – 11 March 1969) was an English science fiction writer best known for his works published under the pen name John Wyndham, although he also used other combinations of his names, such as John Beynon and Lucas Parkes. Some of his works were set in post-apocalyptic landscapes. His best known works include The Day of the Triffids (1951), filmed in 1962, and The Midwich Cuckoos (1957), which was filmed in 1960 as Village of the Damned, in 1995 under the same title, and again in 2022 in Sky Max under its original title.

== Biography ==
=== Early life ===
Wyndham was born in the village of Dorridge near Knowle, Warwickshire, England, the son of Gertrude Parkes, the daughter of the Birmingham ironmaster John Israel Parkes, (Note: John Israel Parkes owned the Eagle Works at Rolfe Street, Smethwick. Parkes younger brother was Ebenezer Parkes, M.P.) and her second husband (after widowhood), George Beynon Harris, a barrister.

From 1909 to 1911 the Harris family lived at 239 Hagley Road, Edgbaston, Birmingham, (Note: The house was demolished sometime between 2018 and 2023) but when he was 8 years old his parents separated. His father then attempted to sue the Parkes family for "the custody, control and society" of his wife and two sons (including Wyndham's younger brother, the writer Vivian Beynon Harris), in an unusual and high-profile 1913 court case, which he lost. The case, which re-exposed previous allegations of sexual impropriety, pre-dating his marriage, left Wyndham's father a broken man. Gertrude moved with the children to a smaller house in Edgbaston and the brothers became estranged from their father. Wyndham subsequently attended a private school in Edgbaston run by a Miss Mabel Woodward, and from 1914 to 1915 was at Edgbaston High School for Boys (he later said that while there he was bullied), and Blundell's School in Tiverton, Devon, during the First World War. His longest and final stay was at Bedales School, near Petersfield in Hampshire (1918–1921), which he left at the age of 18.

His mother left Birmingham to live in a series of boarding houses and spa hotels. In Wyndham's self-penned biographical notes for his early Penguin Books publications, he said he lived in Birmingham only from 1904 to 1911.

=== Early career ===
After leaving school, Wyndham tried several careers, including farming, law, commercial art and advertising; however, he mostly relied on an allowance from his family to survive. He eventually turned to writing for money in 1925 and by 1931 he was selling short stories and serial fiction to American science fiction magazines. His debut short story, "Worlds to Barter", appeared under the pen name John B. Harris in 1931. Subsequent stories were credited to 'John Beynon Harris' until mid-1935, when he began to use the pen name John Beynon. Three novels as by Beynon were published in 1935/36, two of them works of science fiction, the other a detective story. He also used the pen name Wyndham Parkes for one short story in the British Fantasy Magazine in 1939, as John Beynon had already been credited for another story in the same issue. During these years he lived at the Penn Club, London, which had been opened in 1920 by the remaining members of the Friends Ambulance Unit, and which had been partly funded by the Quakers. The intellectual and political mixture of pacifists, socialists and communists continued to inform his views on social engineering and feminism. At the Penn Club he met his future wife, Grace Wilson, a teacher. They embarked on a long-lasting love affair, and obtained adjacent rooms in the club, but for many years did not marry, partly because of the marriage bar under which Wilson would have lost her position.

=== Second World War ===
During the Second World War, Wyndham first served as a censor in the Ministry of Information. He drew on his experiences as a firewatcher during the London Blitz and as a member of the Home Guard in The Day of the Triffids.

He then joined the British Army, serving as a corporal cipher operator in the Royal Corps of Signals. He participated in the Normandy landings, landing a few days after D-Day. He was attached to XXX Corps, which took part in some of the heaviest fighting, including surrounding the trapped German army in the Falaise Pocket.

His wartime letters to his long-time partner, Grace Wilson, are now held in the Archives of the University of Liverpool. He wrote at length of his struggles with his conscience, his doubts about humanity and his fears of the inevitability of further war. He also wrote passionately about his love for her and his fears that he would be so tainted she would not be able to love him when he returned.

=== Postwar ===
After the war Wyndham returned to writing, still using the pen name John Beynon. Inspired by the success of his younger brother Vivian Beynon Harris, who had four novels published starting in 1948, he altered his writing style and by 1951, using the John Wyndham pen name for the first time, he wrote the novel The Day of the Triffids. His pre-war writing career was not mentioned in the book's publicity and people were allowed to assume that this was a first novel from an unknown writer. The book had an enormous success and established Wyndham as an important exponent of science fiction.

He wrote and published six more novels under the name John Wyndham, the name he used professionally from 1951. His novel The Outward Urge (1959) was credited to John Wyndham and Lucas Parkes but Lucas Parkes was another pseudonym for Wyndham. Two story collections, Jizzle and The Seeds of Time, were published in the 1950s under Wyndham's name but included several stories originally published as by John Beynon before 1951.

=== Marriage ===
In 1963, he married Grace Isobel Wilson, whom he had known for more than thirty years, in a civil ceremony. They lived near Petersfield, Hampshire, just outside the grounds of Bedales School, until his death there in 1969, aged 65. The couple were childless, as was his brother, who also outlived him.

== Critical reception ==
Wyndham's reputation rests mainly on the first four of the novels published in his life under that name. (Note: For example, around 2000 they were all reprinted as Penguin Modern Classics.) The Day of the Triffids remains his best-known work, but some readers consider that The Chrysalids was really his best. This is set in the far future of a post-nuclear dystopia where genetic stability is compromised and women are severely oppressed if they give birth to "mutants". David Mitchell, author of Cloud Atlas, wrote of it: "One of the most thoughtful post-apocalypse novels ever written. Wyndham was a true English visionary, a William Blake with a science doctorate." The Guardian states his "innocuously English backdrops are central to the power of his novels, implying that apocalypse could occur at any time — or, indeed, be happening in the next village at this moment", while The Times's reviewer of The Day of the Triffids described it as possessing "all the reality of a vividly realised nightmare."

The ideas in The Chrysalids are echoed in The Handmaid's Tale, whose author, Margaret Atwood, has acknowledged Wyndham's work as an influence. She wrote an introduction to a new edition of Chocky in which she states that the intelligent alien babies in The Midwich Cuckoos entered her dreams.

Wyndham also wrote several short stories, ranging from hard science fiction to whimsical fantasy. Several have been filmed: "Consider Her Ways", "Random Quest", "Dumb Martian", "A Long Spoon", "Jizzle" (filmed as "Maria") and "Time to Rest" (filmed as No Place Like Earth). There is also a radio version of "Survival".

Brian Aldiss, another British science fiction writer, disparaged some of Wyndham's novels as "cosy catastrophes", especially The Day of the Triffids. This became a cliche about his work, but it has been rebutted by many more recent critics. L.J. Hurst commented that in Triffids the main character witnesses several murders, suicides and misadventures, and is frequently in mortal danger. Atwood wrote: "...one might as well call World War II—of which Wyndham was a veteran—a 'cozy' war because not everyone died in it."

Many other writers have acknowledged Wyndham's work as an influence, including Alex Garland, whose screenplay for 28 Days Later draws heavily on The Day of the Triffids.

== Legacy ==
Following his death, some of Wyndham's unsold work was published and his earlier work was republished. His archive was acquired by the University of Liverpool.

On 24 May 2015, an alley in Hampstead that appears in The Day of the Triffids was formally named Triffid Alley as a memorial to him.

== Works ==
=== Novels ===
==== Early pseudonymous novels ====
- The Curse of the Burdens (1927), as by John B. Harris: Aldine Mystery Novels No. 17 (London: Aldine Publishing Co. Ltd) is sometimes attributed to Wyndham but, beyond a vague similarity of names, there is no evidence that he wrote it.
- The Secret People (1935), as by John Beynon
- Foul Play Suspected (1935), as by John Beynon
- Planet Plane (1936), as by John Beynon; republished as The Space Machine and as Stowaway to Mars

==== Published in his lifetime as by John Wyndham ====
- The Day of the Triffids (1951), also known as Revolt of the Triffids
- The Kraken Wakes (1953), published in the U.S. as Out of the Deeps, also known as The Things from the Deep
- The Chrysalids (1955), published in the U.S. as Re-Birth
- The Midwich Cuckoos (1957)
- The Outward Urge (1959), fix-up novel of 4 novelettes and 1 short story, as by John Wyndham and Lucas Parkes:
  "The Space Station: A.D. 1994" (novelette), "The Moon: A.D. 2044" (novelette), "Mars: A.D. 2094" (novelette), "Venus: A.D. 2144" (novelette), "The Emptiness of Space: The Asteroids A.D. 2194" (added in 1961)
- Trouble with Lichen (1960)
- Chocky (1968)

==== Posthumously published ====
- Web (1979)
- Plan for Chaos (2009)

=== Short stories ===
==== Short story collections published in his lifetime ====
- Jizzle (1954), collection of 13 short stories and 2 novelettes:
  "Jizzle", "Technical Slip" (as by John Beynon), "A Present from Brunswick", "Chinese Puzzle" (novelette), "Esmeralda", "How Do I Do?", "Una" (novelette), "Affair of the Heart", "Confidence Trick", "The Wheel", "Look Natural, Please!", "Perforce to Dream", "Reservation Deferred", "Heaven Scent", "More Spinned Against" [compare with Technical Slip: Collected Stories (2024)]
- The Seeds of Time (1956), collection of 5 short stories and 5 novelettes:
  "Chronoclasm" (novelette), "Pillar to Post" (novelette), "Dumb Martian" (novelette), "Compassion Circuit", "Survival" (novelette), "Pawley's Peepholes", "Opposite Number", "Wild Flower", "Time to Rest" (as by John Beynon, Bert #1 series), "Meteor" (novelette, as by John Beynon)
- Tales of Gooseflesh and Laughter (1956), United States edition featuring stories from the Jizzle and The Seeds of Time collections, collection of 9 short stories and 2 novelettes:
  "Chinese Puzzle" (novelette), "Una" (novelette), "The Wheel", "Jizzle", "Heaven Scent", "Compassion Circuit", "More Spinned Against...", "A Present from Brunswick", "Confidence Trick", "Opposite Number", "Wild Flower"
- Consider Her Ways and Others (1961), collection of 3 short stories and 3 novelettes/novellas:
  "Consider Her Ways" (novella), "Odd", "Oh, Where, Now, is Peggy MacRaffery?" (novelette), "A Stitch in Time", "Random Quest" (novelette), "A Long Spoon"
- The Infinite Moment (1961), United States edition of Consider Her Ways and Others with two stories dropped and two others added, collection of 3 short stories and 3 novelettes/novellas:
  "Consider Her Ways" (novella), "Odd", "How Do I Do", "Stitch in Time", "Random Quest" (novelette), "Time Out" (novelette)

==== Posthumously published collections ====
- Sleepers of Mars (1973), collection of 1 short story, 3 novelettes and 1 novella, originally published in magazines in the 1930s:
  "Sleepers of Mars" (novella), "Worlds to Barter" (novelette), "Invisible Monster" (novelette), "The Man from Earth" (novelette), "The Third Vibrator"
- The Best of John Wyndham (1973), collection of 6 short stories and 6 novelettes:
  "The Lost Machine" (novelette), "The Man from Beyond" (novelette), "The Perfect Creature" (novelette), "The Trojan Beam" (novelette), "Vengeance by Proxy" (as by John Beynon), "Adaptation", "Pawley's Peepholes", "The Red Stuff" (novelette), "And the Walls Came Tumbling Down", "Dumb Martian" (novelette), "Close Behind Him", "The Emptiness of Space"
- Wanderers of Time (1973), collection of 1 short story and 4 novelettes, originally published in magazines in the 1930s:
  "Wanderers of Time" (novelette), "Derelict of Space" (novelette), "Child of Power" (novelette), "The Last Lunarians", "The Puff-ball Menace" (novelette)
- The Man from Beyond and Other Stories (1975), hardback with the same contents as The Best of John Wyndham
- Exiles on Asperus (1979), collection of 2 novelettes and 1 novella, as by John Beynon:
  "Exiles on Asperus" (novelette, as by John Beynon Harris), "No Place Like Earth" (novelette, Bert #2 series), "The Venus Adventure" (novella)
- No Place Like Earth (2003), collection of 10 short stories and 6 novelettes:
  "Derelict of Space" (novelette, as by John Beynon), "Time to Rest" (Bert #1 series), "No Place Like Earth" (novelette, as by John Beynon, Bert #2 series), "In Outer Space There Shone a Star", "But a Kind of Ghost", "The Cathedral Crypt" (as by John Beynon Harris), "A Life Postponed" (novelette), "Technical Slip" (as by John Beynon Harris), "Una" (novelette), "It's a Wise Child", "Pillar to Post" (novelette), "The Stare", "Time Stops Today" (novelette), "The Meddler", "Blackmoil", "A Long Spoon"
- Logical Fantasy: The Many Worlds of John Wyndham (2024), collection of 18 short stories including 5 previously uncollected ones, marked with a "*" below:
  "Introduction by Michael Marshall Smith", "The Lost Machine", "Spheres of Hell", "The Man from Beyond", * "Beyond the Screen", "Child of Power", * "The Living Lies", * "The Eternal Eve", "Pawley's Peepholes", "The Wheel", "Survival", "Chinese Puzzle", "Perforce to Dream", * "Never on Mars", "Compassion Circuit", * "Brief to Counsel", "Odd", "The Asteroids, 2194", "A Stitch in Time".
- Technical Slip: Collected Stories (2024), a reprint of Jizzle (1954) with the addition of the 1927 novella "The Curse of the Burdens"

==== Uncollected short stories ====
- "Vivisection" (1919), as by J. W. B. Harris
- "Chocky" (1963), novella, developed into novel Chocky

==== All short stories ====
- "Vivisection" (1919), as by J. W. B. Harris
- "Worlds to Barter" (1931), novelette
- "Exiles on Asperus" (1932), novelette, as by John Beynon Harris
- "The Lost Machine" (1932), novelette
- "The Stare" (1932)
- "The Venus Adventure" (1932), novella, as by John Beynon
- "Invisible Monster", or "Invisible Monsters" (1933), novelette
- "The Puff-ball Menace", or "Spheres of Hell" (1933), novelette
- "The Third Vibrator" (1933)
- "Wanderers of Time" (1933), novelette
- "The Last Lunarians", or "The Moon Devils" (1934)
- "The Man from Earth", or "The Man from Beyond" (1934), novelette
- "The Cathedral Crypt" (1935), as by John Beynon Harris
- "Una", or "The Perfect Creature", or "Perfect Creature", or "Female of the Species" (1937), novelette
- "Judson's Annihilator", or "Beyond the Screen" (1938), novelette, as by John Beynon
- "Child of Power" (1939), novelette
- "Derelict of Space" (1939), novelette
- "Sleepers of Mars" (1939), novella, a sequel to the novel Stowaway to Mars
- "The Trojan Beam" (1939), novelette
- "Vengeance by Proxy" (1940), as by John Beynon
- "Meteor", or "Phoney Meteor" (1941), novelette, as by John Beynon
- "The Living Lies" (1946), novelette, as by John Beynon
- "Adaptation" (1949)
- "Jizzle" (1949)
- "Technical Slip" (1949), as by John Beynon
- "Time to Rest" (1949), as by John Beynon, Bert #1 series
- "The Eternal Eve" (1950)
- "A Present from Brunswick", or "Bargain from Brunswick" (1951)
- "And the Walls Came Tumbling Down", or "And the Walls Came Tumbling Down...", or "...And the Walls Came Tumbling Down..." (1951)
- "No Place Like Earth", or "Tyrant and Slave-Girl on Planet Venus" (1951), novelette, as by John Beynon, Bert #2 series
- "Pawley's Peepholes", or "Operation Peep", or "A New Kind of Pink Elephant" (1951)
- "Pillar to Post", or "Body and Soul" (1951), novelette
- "The Red Stuff" (1951), novelette
- "Affair of the Heart" (1952)
- "Dumb Martian", or "Out of This World" (1952), novelette
- "Survival" (1952), novelette
- "The Wheel" (1952)
- "Chinese Puzzle", or "A Stray from Cathay" (1953), novelette
- "Close Behind Him" (1953)
- "Confidence Trick" (1953)
- "How Do I Do?" (1953)
- "More Spinned Against", or "More Spinned Against..." (1953)
- "Reservation Deferred" (1953)
- "The Chronoclasm", or "Chronoclasm" (1953), novelette
- "Time Out", or "Time Stops Today" (1953), novelette
- "Compassion Circuit", or "Compassion-Circuit" (1954)
- "Esmeralda" (1954)
- "Heaven Scent" (1954)
- "Look Natural, Please!" (1954)
- "Never on Mars" (1954), as by John Beynon
- "Opposite Number" (1954)
- "Perforce to Dream" (1954)
- "Wild Flower" (1955)
- "Consider Her Ways" (1956), novella
- "But a Kind of Ghost" (1957)
- "The Meddler" (1958)
- "Brief to Counsel" (1959)
- "A Long Spoon" (1960)
- "A Stitch in Time", or "Stitch in Time" (1961)
- "Odd" (1961)
- "Oh, Where, Now, Is Peggy MacRafferty?" (1961), novelette
- "Random Quest" (1961), novelette
- "It's a Wise Child", or "Wise Child" (1962)
- "Chocky" (1963), novella, developed into novel Chocky
- "In Outer Space There Shone a Star" (1965)
- "A Life Postponed" (1968), novelette
- "Blackmoil" (2003)

=== Poems ===
- "Hiroshima" (1974), as by John Beynon

== Adaptations ==
- Village of the Damned (1960), film directed by Wolf Rilla, based on novel The Midwich Cuckoos
- "The Long Spoon" (1961), episode of the series Storyboard, directed by James MacTaggart, based on short story "A Long Spoon"
- "Maria" (1961), episode of the series Alfred Hitchcock Presents, directed by Boris Sagal, based on short story "Jizzle"
- "Dumb Martian" (1962), episode of the series Armchair Theatre and Out of This World, directed by Charles Jarrott, based on novelette "Dumb Martian"
- The Day of the Triffids (1963), film directed by Steve Sekely and Freddie Francis, based on novel The Day of the Triffids
- Children of the Damned (1964), film directed by Anton Leader, based on novel The Midwich Cuckoos
- "Consider Her Ways" (1964), episode of the series The Alfred Hitchcock Hour, directed by Robert Stevens, based on novella "Consider Her Ways"
- "No Place Like Earth" (1965), episode of the series Out of the Unknown, directed by Peter Potter, based on short story "Time to Rest" and novelette "No Place on Earth"
- "Random Quest" (1969), episode of the series Out of the Unknown, directed by Christopher Barry, based on novelette "Random Quest"
- Quest for Love (1971), film directed by Ralph Thomas, based on novelette "Random Quest"
- Ördögi szerencse (1978), TV movie directed by Vilmos Dobai, based on short story "A Long Spoon"
- "More Spinned Against" (1980), episode of the series Spine Chillers, based on short story "More Spinned Against"
- The Day of the Triffids (1981), miniseries directed by Ken Hannam, based on novel The Day of the Triffids
- Chocky (1984), series directed by Vic Hughes and Christopher Hodson, based on novel Chocky
- Chocky's Children (1985), series directed by Vic Hughes and Peter Duguid, based on characters from the novel Chocky
- Chocky's Challenge (1986), series directed by Bob Blagden, based on characters from the novel Chocky
- Village of the Damned (1995), film directed by John Carpenter, based on novel The Midwich Cuckoos
- Random Quest (1986), TV movie directed by Luke Watson, based on novelette "Random Quest"
- The Day of the Triffids (2009), miniseries directed by Nick Copus, based on novel The Day of the Triffids
- The Midwich Cuckoos (2022), miniseries directed by Alice Troughton, Jennifer Perrott and Börkur Sigþórsson, based on novel The Midwich Cuckoos

== General and cited references ==
- Aldiss, Brian W (1973). Billion Year Spree: The History of Science Fiction. Weidenfeld & Nicolson. ISBN 978-0-297-76555-4.
- Harris, Vivian Beynon, "My Brother, John Wyndham: A Memoir" transcribed and edited by David Ketterer, in Foundation: The International Review of Science Fiction 28 (Spring 1999) pp. 5–50
- Binns, Amy (2019). Hidden Wyndham: Life, Love, Letters. Grace Judson Press. ISBN 9780992756710.
- Ketterer David, "Questions and Answers: The Life and Fiction of John Wyndham" in The New York Review of Science Fiction 16 (March 2004) pp. 1, 6–10
- Ketterer, David, "The Genesis of the Triffids" in The New York Review of Science Fiction 16 (March 2004) pp. 11–14
- Ketterer, David, "John Wyndham and the Sins of His Father: Damaging Disclosures in Court" in Extrapolation 46 (Summer 2005) pp. 163–188
- Ketterer, David (1 July 1999). "'Vivisection': Schoolboy 'John Wyndham's' First Publication?". Science Fiction Studies. 78. Depauw: 303–311. doi:10.1525/sfs.26.2.0303. Archived from the original on 8 January 2004..
- Ketterer, David, "'A Part of the ... Family': John Wyndham's The Midwich Cuckoos as Estranged Autobiography in Learning from Other Worlds: Estrangement, Cognition and the Politics of Science Fiction and Utopia edited by Patrick Parrinder (Liverpool: University of Liverpool Press, 2001) pp. 146–177
- Ketterer, David, "When and Where Was John Wyndham Born?" in Foundation: The International Review of Science Fiction 42 (Summer 2012/13) pp. 22–39
- Ketterer, David, "John Wyndham (1903[?]–1969)" in The Literary Encyclopedia (online, 7 November 2006)
- Ketterer, David, "John Wyndham: The Facts of Life Sextet" in A Companion to Science Fiction edited by David Seed (Oxford: Blackwell, 2003) pp. 375–388
- Ketterer, David, "John Wyndham's World War III and His Abandoned Fury of Creation Trilogy" in Future Wars: The Anticipations and the Fears edited by David Seed (Liverpool: Liverpool University Press, 2012) pp. 103–129
- Ketterer, David, "John B. Harris's Mars Rover on Earth" in Science Fiction Studies 41 (July 2014) pp. 474–475
