= Vivian Harris (disambiguation) =

Vivian Harris (born 1978) is a Guyanese boxer.

Vivian Harris may also refer to:

- Vivian Beynon Harris (1906–1987), English writer
- Vivian Harris (comedian) (1902-2000), comedian and chorus girl at the Apollo Theater

== See also ==
- Vivienne Harris (disambiguation)
- Viv Harris, fictional character
