= Penn club =

Penn Club may refer to:

- Penn Club, London
- Penn Club of New York City
- The Penn Club of Philadelphia
