= Tales of Gooseflesh and Laughter =

British science fiction anthology

- Author: John Wyndham
- Cover artist: Richard M. Powers
- Language: English
- Genre: Science fiction
- Publisher: Ballantine Books
- Publication date: 1956

Tales of Gooseflesh and Laughter is a collection of eleven science fiction stories (nine short stories and two novelettes) by British writer John Wyndham, published in 1956 by Ballantine Books.

== Contents ==
- "Chinese Puzzle" (1953), novelette
- "Una" (1954), novelette, variant of "The Perfect Creature" (1937)
- "The Wheel" (1952)
- "Jizzle" (1949)
- "Heaven Scent" (1954)
- "Compassion Circuit" (1954)
- "More Spinned Against..." (1953), variant of "More Spinned Against"
- "A Present from Brunswick" (1951)
- "Confidence Trick" (1953)
- "Opposite Number" (1954), variant of "Opposite Numbers"
- "Wild Flower" (1955)

"Opposite Numbers", "Wild Flower" and "Compassion Circuit" also appear in The Seeds of Time, the rest of the material is also contained in Jizzle.

== Adaptations ==
- "Maria" (1961), episode of the series Alfred Hitchcock Presents, directed by Boris Sagal, based on short story "Jizzle"
- "More Spinned Against" (1980), episode of the series Spine Chillers, based on short story "More Spinned Against"
