= The Secret People =

1935 novel by John Wyndham

- First edition
- Author: John Beynon
- Language: English
- Genre: Science fiction
- Publisher: George Newnes
- Publication date: 1935
- Publication place: United Kingdom
- Media type: Print (Hardback)
- Pages: 256

For the Audrey Hepburn film of the same title, see Secret People (film).

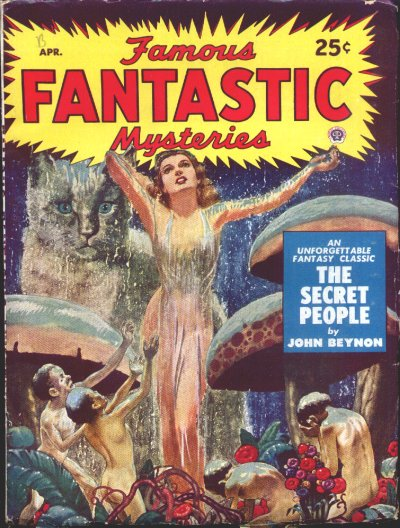
The Secret People was reprinted in the April 1950 issue of Famous Fantastic Mysteries

The Secret People (1935) is a science fiction novel by English writer John Wyndham. It is set in 1964, and features a British couple who find themselves held captive by an ancient race of pygmies dwelling beneath the Sahara desert. The novel was written under Wyndham's early pen name, John Beynon.

== Plot summary ==
The Sahara is being flooded to create a new sea when the protagonist of the novel, Mark Sunnet, crashes his private rocket plane into an island of what is currently little more than a large lake. He soon finds himself and companion Margaret Lawn, and a stray cat that they call Bast, sucked into a cavern in which they are promptly captured by mysterious pygmies.

The diet of little people is centred on large fungi. The captives speculate that stories that reached the surface of the little people and their giant mushrooms may have led to the myth of gnomes.

Sunnet finds that a tiered community has evolved in the caverns, the pygmies inhabiting a large underground collection of natural and artificial caverns and tunnels, and the captured humans are deliberately isolated in a subsection of the caverns. He is also surprised to learn that family life exists there. "Natives", children of captured humans who were born underground and lived all their lives in the caverns are generally happy with their life and have no wish to escape.

By virtue of being accompanied by Bast, the pygmies consider Margaret to be divine and isolate her in a separate area of the caverns.

Most of the captured humans wish to escape by trying two different methods. One by tunneling up at an angle to try to break through to the surface and another horizontally in the hope of intersecting a pygmy tunnel or cavern from which to make their way to the surface.

The pygmies are distressed, and Sunnet's arrival reveals the reason to the captives. The pygmies fear that the newly formed Sahara Sea will flood and destroy their environment, annihilating them. Their fear is well-founded, and the waters break through into their world, flooding the entire ecosystem. Sunnet, Margaret, Bast and a handful of others survive. The story finishes with sunburn after years of subterranean life, and with establishing a new company based on the primitive but unique technology that the escapees brought with them from the caverns.

== Predictions ==
Set in 1964, the novel correctly identifies Queen Elizabeth II as the reigning monarch of Britain although she was only third in the line of succession when the novel was published in 1935 and became queen only in 1952.

An early passage in the book describes the comic-military reactions of Germany, which in 1935 was under Nazi rule, towards potential violations of their airspace by the protagonist's descending rocket plane. That suggests Wyndham considered it possible that the Third Reich would survive at least another 30 years into the future, an expectation of totalitarian regime longevity that is mirrored by his similar projections of the continued existence of the Soviet Union into the 21st century in The Outward Urge.

The novel also references the Piltdown Man, which had not yet been exposed as a hoax at the time of publication.

== Bibliography ==
- Bleiler, Everett (1948). The Checklist of Fantastic Literature. Chicago: Shasta Publishers. p. 50.
