= Vivienne Harris =

Vivienne Harris may refer to:

- Vivienne Harris (camogie), Cork camogie player
- Vivienne Harris (businesswoman) (1921–2011), British businesswoman, newspaper publisher and journalist

== See also ==
- Viv Harris, fictional character
- Vivian Harris (disambiguation)
