= Birmingham Central =

Parliamentary constituency in the United Kingdom, 1885–1918

- Former borough constituency for the House of Commons

1885–1918
- Seats: One
- Created from: Birmingham
- Replaced by: Birmingham Edgbaston

Birmingham Central is a former parliamentary constituency in the city of Birmingham, England. It returned one Member of Parliament (MP) to the House of Commons of the Parliament of the United Kingdom, elected by the first-past-the-post voting system.

The constituency was created upon the abolition of the Birmingham constituency in 1885, and was itself abolished for the 1918 general election.

== Boundaries ==
Before 1885 the city of Birmingham, in the county of Warwickshire, had been a three-member constituency (see Birmingham (UK Parliament constituency) for further details). Under the Redistribution of Seats Act 1885 the parliamentary borough of Birmingham was split into seven single-member divisions, one of which was Birmingham Central. It consisted of the wards of Market Hall, Ladywood, and St Thomas's.

The division was bounded to the west and south-west by Birmingham Edgbaston, to the north by Birmingham North, to the north-east by Birmingham East and to the south and south-east by Birmingham South.

In the 1918 redistribution of parliamentary seats, the Representation of the People Act 1918 provided for twelve new Birmingham divisions. The Central division was abolished.

== Members of Parliament ==
Year	Member	Party
1885	John Bright	Liberal
1886	John Bright	Liberal Unionist
1889	John Albert Bright	Liberal Unionist
1895	Ebenezer Parkes	Liberal Unionist
1912	Ebenezer Parkes	Unionist
1918	Constituency abolished	

== Elections ==
=== Elections in the 1880s ===
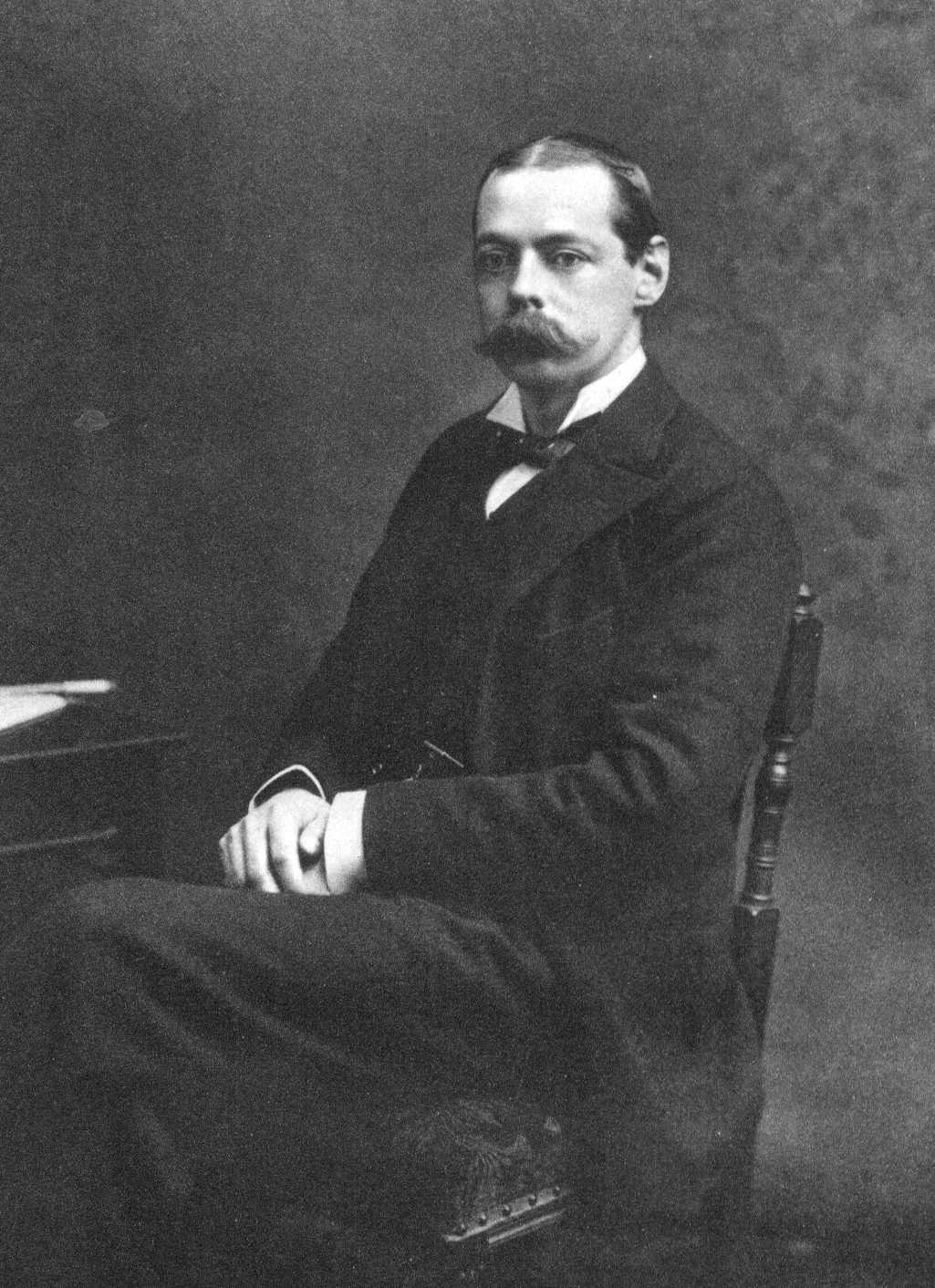
Churchill

General election 1885: Birmingham Central
Party	Candidate	Votes	%	±%
Liberal	John Bright	4,989	54.2	
Conservative	Randolph Churchill	4,216	45.8	
Majority		773	8.4	
Turnout		9,205	84.3	
Registered electors		10,923		
Liberal win (new seat)				

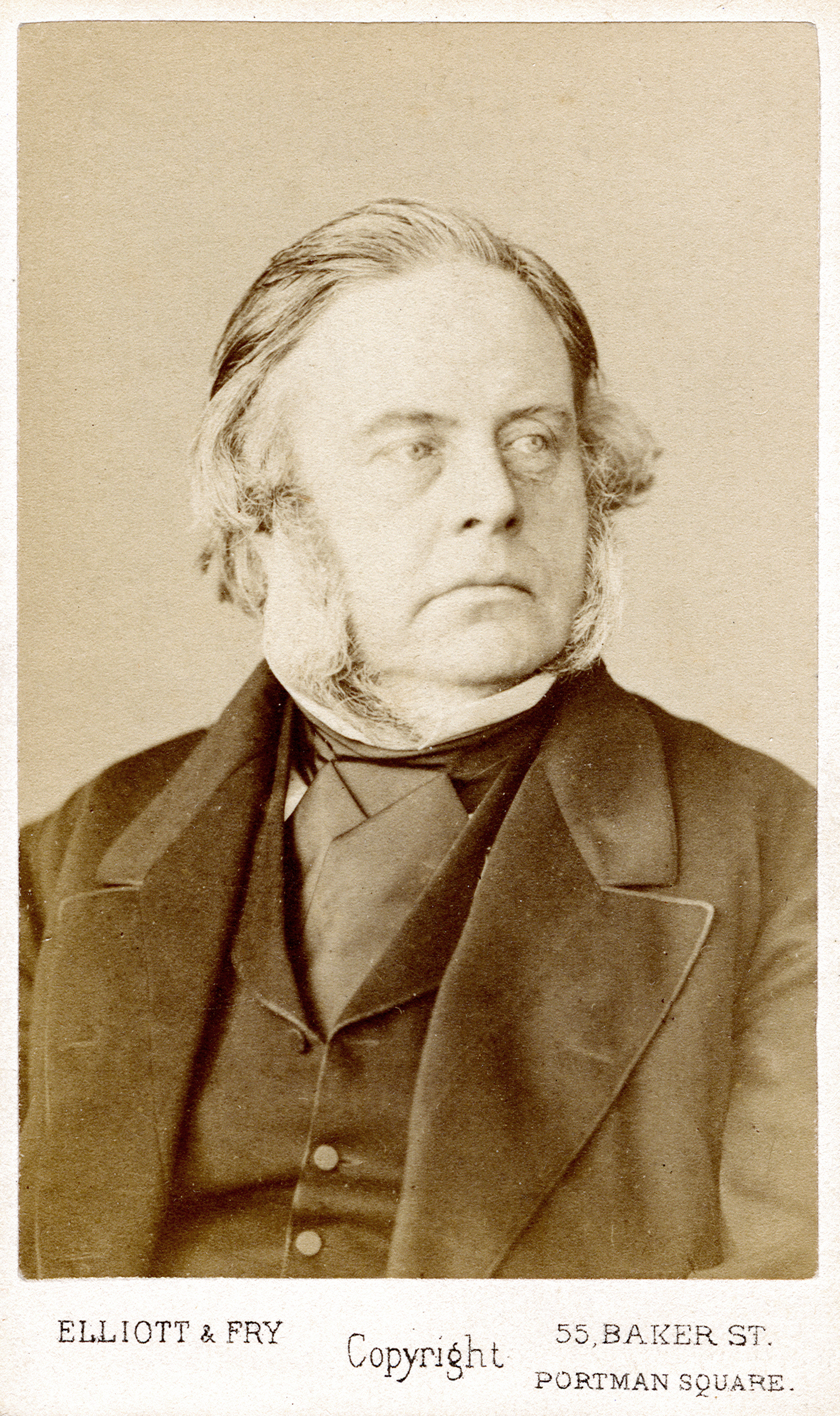
Bright

General election 1886: Birmingham Central
Party	Candidate	Votes	%	±%
Liberal Unionist	John Bright	Unopposed		
Liberal Unionist gain from Liberal				

Bright's death caused a by-election.

By-election, 15 Apr 1889
Party	Candidate	Votes	%	±%
Liberal Unionist	John Albert Bright	5,621	68.7	N/A
Liberal	William Beale	2,561	31.3	New
Majority		3,060	37.4	N/A
Turnout		8,182	69.0	N/A
Registered electors		11,851		
Liberal Unionist hold		Swing	N/A	

=== Elections in the 1890s ===
General election 1892: Birmingham Central
Party	Candidate	Votes	%	±%
Liberal Unionist	John Albert Bright	5,525	78.4	N/A
Liberal	Jesse Herbert	1,522	21.6	N/A
Majority		4,003	56.8	N/A
Turnout		7,047	59.2	N/A
Registered electors		11,904		
Liberal Unionist hold		Swing	N/A	

Parkes

General election 1895: Birmingham Central
Party	Candidate	Votes	%	±%
Liberal Unionist	Ebenezer Parkes	Unopposed		
Liberal Unionist hold				

=== Elections in the 1900s ===
General election 1900: Birmingham Central
Party	Candidate	Votes	%	±%
Liberal Unionist	Ebenezer Parkes	Unopposed		
Liberal Unionist hold				

General election 1906: Birmingham Central
Party	Candidate	Votes	%	±%
Liberal Unionist	Ebenezer Parkes	5,684	73.3	N/A
Liberal	Thomas Grosvenor Lee	2,075	26.7	New
Majority		3,609	46.6	N/A
Turnout		7,759	72.7	N/A
Registered electors		10,670		
Liberal Unionist hold		Swing	N/A	

=== Elections in the 1910s ===
General election January 1910: Birmingham Central
Party	Candidate	Votes	%	±%
Liberal Unionist	Ebenezer Parkes	6,015	77.9	+4.6
Liberal	Arthur Brampton	1,711	22.1	−4.6
Majority		4,304	55.8	+9.2
Turnout		7,726	78.0	+5.3
Liberal Unionist hold		Swing	+4.6	

General election December 1910: Birmingham Central
Party	Candidate	Votes	%	±%
Liberal Unionist	Ebenezer Parkes	4,640	76.6	−1.3
Liberal	Henry John Manton	1,417	23.4	+1.3
Majority		3,223	53.2	−2.6
Turnout		6,057	61.1	−16.9
Liberal Unionist hold		Swing	-1.3	

General Election 1914–15:

Another General Election was required to take place before the end of 1915. The political parties had been making preparations for an election to take place and by July 1914, the following candidates had been selected;

- Unionist: Ebenezer Parkes
- Liberal: Arthur Brampton

== See also ==
- List of former United Kingdom Parliament constituencies
