= Robinson Crusoe (Play of the Month) =

- Play of the Month episode
- Directed by: James MacTaggart
- Written by: James MacTaggart
- Based on: Robinson Crusoe by Daniel Dafoe
- Cinematography by: Brian Tufano
- Original air date: 27 November 1974
- Running time: 120 mins

"Robinson Crusoe" is a television play episode of the BBC One anthology television series Play of the Month based on the 1719 novel of the same name by Daniel Defoe, and starring Stanley Baker in the title role and Ram John Holder as Friday. The episode originally aired on 27 November 1974.

Shooting took place on location at Tobago in the West Indies. Director James MacTaggart died of a heart attack shortly after filming and Stanley Baker died of cancer in 1976. The budget was £300,000.

== Reception ==
The Sunday Times called it a "superb production".

When the show aired in the United States it was the 13th highest rated show of the week.
