= The Seeds of Time =

1956 sci-fi collection by John Wyndham

- First edition
- Author: John Wyndham
- Cover artist: Richard Barton
- Language: English
- Genre: Science Fiction
- Publisher: Michael Joseph
- Publication date: 1956

The Seeds of Time is a collection of science fiction stories (five short stories and five novelettes) by British writer John Wyndham, published in 1956 by Michael Joseph.

== Contents ==
- A foreword by John Wyndham
- "The Chronoclasm" (1953), novelette, variant of "Chronoclasm"
- "Pillar to Post" (1951), novelette
- "Dumb Martian" (1952), novelette
- "Compassion Circuit" (1954)
- "Survival" (1952), novelette
- "Pawley's Peepholes" (1951)
- "Opposite Number" (1954)
- "Wild Flower" (1955)
- "Time to Rest" (1949), as by John Beynon, Bert #1 series
- "Meteor" (1941), novelette, as by John Beynon

== Summaries ==
"Chronoclasm"
a time-travelling romantic comedy.
"Pillar to Post"
The central character is a paraplegic who was badly injured in a wartime attack. Frequently taking drugs to cope with the pain, he finds himself in a healthy body very far in the future. A complex plot of body-swapping and time travel ensues. It is considered by some people to be the best story in the collection.
"Dumb Martian"
a satire on racism, featuring an Earthman who buys a Martian wife.
"Compassion Circuit"
a horror story on the subject of robotics.
"Survival"
set on a spacecraft marooned in orbit around Mars.
"Pawley's Peepholes"
another time travel story, this time a comedy in which tourists projected from the future cause chaos in a present-day town.
"Opposite Number"
which plays with the concept of parallel universes.
"Wild Flower"
which explores the tension between nature and technology.
"Time to Rest"
depicting the life on Mars of a human survivor of the destruction of Earth. A sequel "No Place Like Earth" appears in the collection No Place Like Earth (2003), which contains both.
"Meteor"
in which alien visitors to Earth find themselves on a very different scale to humans.

== Adaptations ==
- "Dumb Martian" (1962), episode of the series Armchair Theatre and Out of This World, directed by Charles Jarrott, based on novelette "Dumb Martian"
- "No Place Like Earth" (1965), episode of the series Out of the Unknown, directed by Peter Potter, based on short story "Time to Rest" and novelette "No Place on Earth"
- A BBC Radio 4 adaption of "Survival" was broadcast in 1989 with Stephen Garlick, Susan Sheridan, and Nicholas Courtney. It was released as an Audiobook in 2007 with the 1981 version of The Chrysalids.
