= Vivian Beynon Harris =

English writer

- Born: 1906
- Died: 1987 (aged 80–81)
- Occupation: British writer

Vivian (Parkes Lucas) Beynon Harris (1906–1987) was an English writer. He was the younger brother of the well-known science fiction writer John Wyndham.

== Early life ==
His mother was Gertrude Parkes, the daughter of successful Birmingham ironmaster John Israel Parkes. (Note: John Israel Parkes owned the Eagle Works at Rolfe Street, Smethwick. Parkes younger brother was Ebenezer Parkes, M.P.) His father was George Beynon Harris, a schoolteacher from Port Eynon in South Wales, who, after passing the Incorporated Law Society final examination in 1889, practised as a solicitor in Cardiff, becoming a member of the Town Council in 1897.

After marrying Gertrude, George became a barrister, a career more suited to their social position.

From 1909 to 1911 the Harris family lived at 239 Hagley Road, Edgbaston, Birmingham (Note: The house was demolished sometime between 2018 and 2023) but in 1911 his parents separated. His father then attempted to sue the Parkes family for "the custody, control and society" of his wife and two sons, in an unusual and high-profile 1913 court case, which he lost. The case, which re-exposed previous allegations of sexual impropriety, pre-dating his marriage, left the boys' father a broken man. Gertrude moved with the children to a smaller house in Edgbaston until 1915, and then lived in a number of hotels as he and his brother attended boarding schools. The brothers became estranged from their father.

He wrote of his upbringing, "We loved our mother and each other and we were as close as it is possible for a family to be." Later, the two boys both attended Bedales School in Hampshire. Harris and his brother remained very close for the rest of their lives.

From 1925 to 1927, Harris studied to become an actor at the Royal Academy of Dramatic Art in London, then had an engagement at the Royal Court Theatre, Sloane Square during 1927. Following this, he moved to Eastbourne due to ill health.

== Career ==
Some years later, while he was recovering from a nervous breakdown suffered during World War II, his brother suggested he should try writing. He wrote that he "completed a humorous book after several months of hard work. I think this surprised him because before the war application had not been my strong point. He gave me an introduction to Curtis Brown, then his agent and within a short time it was sold outright. I promptly started another while he got back to work at the Penn Club on a thriller in which people were splattered on water & burst on pavements like poached eggs. Nobody seemed too keen on this and while it was going round the publishers I wrote another book sold it & signed a contract for three more. It wasn't that my books were any good as anything but time-wasters and laugh providers but it upset him to find a mere amateur was getting away with it while a professional couldn't." Harris had four novels published between 1948 and 1951, all of which "employ a light, comedy-of-manners style".

He and his brother were in almost daily contact until his brother's death in 1969, after which he was responsible for administering his brother's literary estate. He also wrote two memoirs of his brother including one for Foundation: The International Review Of Science Fiction.

== Death and legacy ==
After Harris died in 1987, his bequest amounting to £9924.29 to the National Trust was put towards the purchase of Cwrt Farm, west of Aberdaron in North Wales, where a panel now reads:

The National Trust is grateful for the financial assistance received towards the acquisition of Cwrt farm from the Countryside Commission, the World Wide Fund for Nature Conservation (with sponsorship from Office Supplies Ltd.), the Nature Conservancy Council, individual donors and a substantial legacy from Vivian Beynon Harris in memory of his brother (who wrote under the name of 'John Wyndham'), Gertrude Harris, Grace Beynon Harris and Lila Mary Grettan.

This memorial includes his mother Gertrude, his brother's wife Grace and his own long-time partner Lila, but excludes any mention of his father.

== Works ==
Four of his novels were published, and at least five more were completed but remained unpublished.

- Trouble at Hanard (London: Partridge Publications, 1948)
- Confusion at Campden Trig (London: Museum Press Limited, 1948)
- One Thing Constant (London: Museum Press Limited, 1949)
- Song for a Siren (London: Museum Press Limited, 1951)

Unpublished works include:

- Son of the Morning (science fiction novel)
- Happiness Music (science fiction novel)
- Jack and me: growing up with John Wyndham (manuscript)
- John Wyndham, 1903–1969 (manuscript)
