= The Midwich Cuckoos =

1957 science fiction novel by John Wyndham

- First Edition dust jacket cover
- Author: John Wyndham
- Cover artist: Dick Hart
- Language: English
- Genre: Science fiction
- Publisher: Michael Joseph
- Publication date: 1957
- Publication place: United Kingdom
- Pages: 239
- ISBN: 978-0-7181-0236-4
- OCLC: 10234129
- Dewey Decimal: 823.914
- LC Class: PZ3.H2422 M PR6045

The Midwich Cuckoos is a 1957 science fiction novel written by the English author John Wyndham. It tells the tale of an English village in which the women become pregnant by brood parasitic aliens. The book has been praised by many critics, including the dramatist Dan Rebellato, who called it "a searching novel of moral ambiguities", and the novelist Margaret Atwood, who called the book Wyndham's "chef d'œuvre". The book has been adapted for film, radio, and television.

== Plot ==
Ambulances arrive at two traffic accidents blocking the only roads into the English village of Midwich, Winshire. Attempting to approach the village, one ambulance-man becomes unconscious. As gas poisoning is suspected, the army is notified. They discover that a caged canary becomes unconscious upon entering the affected region, but regains consciousness when removed. Further experiments reveal the region to be a hemisphere with a diameter of 2 mi (3.2 km) around the village. Aerial photography shows an unidentifiable silvery object on the ground in the centre of the affected zone.

After one day, the effect vanishes, along with the unidentified object, and the villagers wake with no apparent ill effects. Some months later they realise that every woman of child-bearing age is pregnant with all indications that the pregnancies were caused by xenogenesis during the period of unconsciousness that has come to be referred to as the "Dayout".

When the 31 boys and 30 girls are born, they appear normal, except for their unusual golden eyes, light blonde hair and pale, silvery skin. The children have none of the genetic characteristics of their mothers. As they grow up, it becomes increasingly apparent that they are not completely human. They possess telepathic abilities and can control others' actions. The Children (they are referred to with a capital C) have two distinct group minds, one for the boys and another for the girls. Their physical development is accelerated compared with that of humans; upon reaching the age of nine, they appear to be sixteen-year-olds.

The Children protect themselves as much as possible using a form of mind control. One young man who accidentally clips a Child on the hip with his car is made to drive into a wall and kill himself. A bull that chased the Children is forced into a pond to drown. The villagers form a mob and try to burn down the Midwich Grange (a farm where the Children are taught and live) but the Children make the villagers attack each other.

The Military Intelligence department learns that the same phenomenon has occurred in four other parts of the world, including an Inuit settlement in the Canadian Arctic, a small township in Australia's Northern Territory, a Mongolian village and the town of Gizhinsk in eastern Russia, north-east of Okhotsk. The Inuit killed the newborn Children, sensing they were not their own, and the Mongolians killed both Children and mothers. The Australian babies had all died within a few weeks, suggesting that something may have gone wrong with the xenogenesis process. The Russian town was recently "accidentally" destroyed by the Soviet government, using an atomic cannon from a range of 50–60 mi (80–97 km).

The Children are aware of the danger and use their power to prevent aeroplanes from flying over the village. During an interview with a Military Intelligence officer, the Children explain that to solve the problem they must be destroyed. They explain it is not possible to kill them unless the entire village is bombed, which would result in civilian deaths. The Children present an ultimatum: they want to migrate to a secure location where they can live unharmed. They demand aeroplanes from the government.

An elderly, educated Midwich resident, named Gordon Zellaby, realises the Children must be killed as soon as possible. As he has only a few weeks left to live due to a heart condition, he feels obliged to do something. He has acted as a teacher of and mentor to the Children and they regard him with as much affection as they can have for any human, permitting him to approach them more closely than others. One evening, he hides a bomb in his projection equipment while showing the Children a film about the Greek islands. Zellaby sets off the bomb, killing himself and all of the Children.

== Cuckoos ==
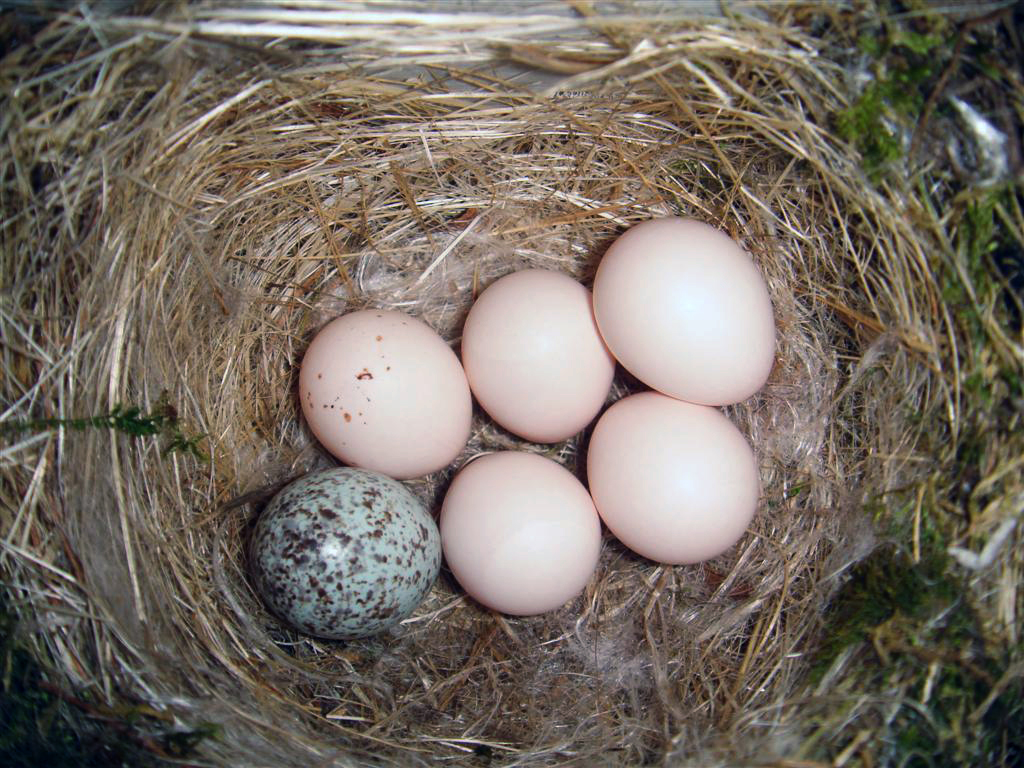
Brood parasites such as cuckoos lay their eggs in other birds' nests for them to raise.

The "cuckoo" in the novel's title alludes to a family of birds, of which nearly 60 species are brood parasites, laying their eggs in the nests of other birds. These species are obligate brood parasites, only reproducing in this way, the best-known example being the Eurasian cuckoo. The cuckoo egg hatches earlier than the host's, and the cuckoo chick grows faster; in most cases the chick evicts the eggs or young of the host species, while encouraging the host to keep pace with its high growth rate.

== Reception ==
The Galaxy columnist Floyd C. Gale, reviewing the original issue in 1958, praised the novel as "a most off-trail and well-written invasion yarn." Thomas M. Wagner of SFReviews.net concluded in 2004 that the novel "remains a cracking good read despite some obviously dated elements." Damon Knight, however, wrote in 1967 that Wyndham's novelistic treatment "is deadly serious, and I'm sorry to say, deadly dull ... about page 90 the story begins to bog down under layers of polite restraint, sentimentality, lethargy and women's-magazine masochism, and it never lifts its head long again." The writer Christina Hardyment, writing in The Times in 2008, commented that the book packed even more of a punch in an age of "genetic experimentation" than it had done in the 1950s.

=== Dan Rebellato ===
The dramatist Dan Rebellato, writing in The Guardian in 2010, called Wyndham probably the most successful British science fiction author since H. G. Wells and his books so familiar that people do not study them closely. In Rebellato's view, The Midwich Cuckoos was, on rereading, "a searching novel of moral ambiguities where once I'd seen only an inventive but simple SF thriller", a book that questioned the assumptions of its narrator character. It dealt, he argued, with the struggle between men and women at least as much as between people and aliens, touching on rape, abortion, childbirth and motherhood, with a subtext a great deal more subtle than the narrator's brusque story. Rebellato observed, too, that Wyndham was writing in the 1950s under the Lord Chamberlain's censorship for obscenity, so his use of "misdirection, subtext, irony and ambiguity" were necessary to allow publication of his discussion of sexuality. Rebellato addresses, too, the New Wave science fiction writer Brian Aldiss's criticism of Wyndham's books as "cosy catastrophes"; in Rebellato’s view, the stories may look like that but they are "surprisingly unheroic" and often open-ended, while underneath they are "very uncosy, persistently unsettling", asking profound questions about the limits of Western culture.

=== Margaret Atwood ===
The novelist Margaret Atwood, writing in Slate in 2015, commented that in her opinion, The Midwich Cuckoos was John Wyndham's chef d'œuvre, selling very well, "cozy catastrophes" or not, though she observed that "one might as well call World War II—of which Wyndham was a veteran—a 'cozy' war because not everyone died in it". She noted, too, that just like the children in The Chrysalids, the cuckoo children use their special abilities to help each other and that Wyndham never made up his mind on the moral question of whether it would be a good thing to know what other people were thinking.

== Abandoned sequel ==
Wyndham began work on a sequel novel, Midwich Main, which he abandoned after only a few chapters.

== Adaptations ==
=== Film ===
==== Official ====
- Village of the Damned (1960), film directed by Wolf Rilla
- Children of the Damned (1964), a sequel directed by Anton Leader
- Village of the Damned (1995), directed by John Carpenter. It featured Christopher Reeve in his last film role before he was paralysed, and included Kirstie Alley as a government official, in roles similar to the characters of Gordon Zellaby and Colonel Westcott, respectively.

===== Unproduced projects =====
A Metro-Goldwyn-Mayer remake to have begun filming during 1981 was cancelled. Christopher Wood was in the midst of writing a script for producer Lawrence P. Bachmann when the Writers Guild of America intervened.

==== Unofficial ====
- The 1994 Thai movie Blackbirds at Bangpleng is based on a 1989 novel by the Thai writer and politician Kukrit Pramoj, which in turn is derived from Wyndham's book.

=== Television ===
- The Midwich Cuckoos (2022), miniseries directed by Alice Troughton, Jennifer Perrott and Börkur Sigþórsson

=== Radio ===
- A 1982 radio production adapted by William Ingram in three 30-minute episodes for the BBC World Service. It was first broadcast between 9 and 23 December 1982. It was directed by Gordon House, with music by Roger Limb of the BBC Radiophonic Workshop. It is regularly repeated on BBC Radio 4 Extra.
- A 2003 radio production adapted by Dan Rebellato in two 60-minute episodes for BBC Radio 4. It was first broadcast between 30 November and 7 December 2003. It was directed by Polly Thomas, with music by Chris Madin. It was released on CD by BBC Audiobooks in 2007.
- A 2017-18 radio production adapted by Graeae Theatre Company was broadcast on BBC Radio 4 on 31 December 2017 and 7 January 2018.

Character	1982	2003	2017
Bernard Westcott	Charles Kay		
Richard Gayford	William Gaunt	Bill Nighy	
Janet Gayford	Rosalynd Adams	Sarah Parish	Alexandra Mathie
Gordon Zellaby	Manning Wilson	Clive Merrison	Tyrone Huggins
Angela Zellaby	Pauline Yates	Mariella Brown	
Ferelleyn Zellaby	Jenny Quayle	Katherine Tozer	
Alan Hughes	Gordon Dulieu	Nicholas R. Bailey	
William		Casey O'Brien	

== See also ==
- Dark They Were, and Golden-Eyed
