= Plan for Chaos =

2009 novel by John Wyndham

- First edition hardcover
- Author: John Wyndham
- Language: English
- Genre: Science fiction
- Publisher: Liverpool University Press
- Publication date: 2009
- Publication place: United Kingdom
- Media type: Print (Hardcover & Paperback)
- Pages: 263 (first edition, hardcover)
- ISBN: 978-1-84631-179-6
- OCLC: 461263735

Plan for Chaos is a science fiction novel by British writer John Wyndham, first published in 2009. Wyndham was working on it about the same time as The Day of the Triffids, but it was rejected by publishers on both sides of the Atlantic and never published in his lifetime. Wyndham himself abandoned it, telling his US agent Frederik Pohl in 1951: "I've messed about with the thing so much that I've lost all perspective".

It was eventually re-discovered after the John Wyndham Archive was acquired by the University of Liverpool in the UK and was published on the fortieth anniversary of the author's death, under the planned US title Plan for Chaos; the planned UK title had been Fury of Creation.

== Plot ==
Johnny Farthing is a freelance photographer working in America, although he was born in Sweden, he has an American passport from his father's birthright, and was educated in England and France. He and his first cousin Freda plan on getting married, but her father - Uncle Nils - disapproves. Their Aunt Marta - the youngest of the family - was a dedicated Nazi before and during the war and suspected of being in Hitler's bunker on the day he died. Nils believes Marta's fanaticism is a genetic anomaly, and marrying in the family would exacerbate this with any further children. Based on the ages of Johnny and Freda it is assumed to be around 30 years after the end of the war.

During his work he comes across several women who have recently died - by suicide, accident or suspected murder - and all look exactly the same as Freda. It soon becomes apparent that as well as Freda doppelgangers there are multiple versions of Johnny - he is mistaken for them and vice versa several times. Freda is kidnapped by the doubles and while investigating Johnny is also captured. Taking advantage of their similarity he knocks out and takes the place of one of his doubles - who is then killed as "Johnny" tries to escape - and infiltrates the operation, being taken to their base by flying saucer along with another group of doubles.

Johnny is eventually found out and taken to see "The Mother" who oversees the operation. This turns out to be Aunt Marta, who was indeed with the Führer on his last days, but became disillusioned with him and his personal ideology after he accepted defeat. Taking advantage of the chaos she, her followers and a number of gifted scientists absconded to a secret redoubt prepared for the Führer's use where they have been ever since. Various scientific breakthroughs have given her cloning for her doubles, flying saucers for transport and the ability to control the satellite nuclear weapons of other nations. Her plan is to start a nuclear war and once the world has been devastated, her doubles will create a Fourth Reich with her as the new Führer.

Johnny and Freda soon establish that there is dissent in the base, with several factions all wanting different outcomes. Many of the doubles are unhappy with their isolation, and want the freedom of the outside world - some have created lives for themselves while off-base, and a few have gone so far as to refuse to return at the end of assignments. These are the double women being eliminated by hit squads. There is also conflict between base security, the science wing and Marta's personal guard. Freda discovers underlying resentment between the male and female doubles, with occasional skirmishes between the two groups slowly escalating. Exacerbated by Johnny & Freda's arrival this culminates in a three-way coup which mortally wounds Marta and allows Johnny and Freda (now impersonating Marta) to escape in a flying saucer, along with Marta's security detail and personal doctor. Upon landing at an outpost they are ambushed by Australian armed forces and several doubles are killed, as well as the doctor. The flying saucer proves impervious to small arms fire and escapes with the remainder of the doubles. Johnny and Freda are interrogated by the Australians who learn little as neither Johnny or Freda know the base's location, and the doctor - who did - was killed. Johnny muses that little has changed as the base still exists, as does the technology for cloning, and he can still expect a "plan for chaos" at some point in the future.

== Reception ==
Science fiction author M. John Harrison was unimpressed by the book, declaring it "almost unreadable". Jake Kerridge from The Daily Telegraph, however, stated that Wyndham utilised some of his later themes in the novel resulting in an entertaining read. Leo Mellor from The Independent conceded that it was not "an extraordinary lost masterpiece", but was nevertheless "fascinating."

== See also ==
- The Boys from Brazil (novel)
