= Ebenezer Parkes =

British politician

Parkes in 1895.

Sir Edward Ebenezer Parkes (1848 – 29 June 1919) was an English Liberal Unionist politician who served as Member of Parliament (MP) for Birmingham Central.

Born in Tipton, Parkes was the son of an ironmaster. Joining his father's business, he became a prominent local businessman. He was appointed JP for Birmingham in 1892 and served on the city council for a number of years.

When the Liberal Unionist John Albert Bright stood down at the 1895 general election, Parkes was elected in his place to the House of Commons. He held the seat until the constituency was abolished for the 1918 general election, sitting as a Conservative after the Conservatives and Liberal Unionists merged in 1912.

He was knighted in 1917.

After Birmingham Central's abolition, he did not seek re-election again.

He was great-uncle to the writers John Wyndham and Vivian Beynon Harris.

Parliament of the United Kingdom
Preceded by John Albert Bright	Member of Parliament for Birmingham Central; 1895–1918	Constituency abolished
