= Studio 4 (TV series) =

1962 British TV drama anthology series

- Genre: Drama
- Country of origin: United Kingdom
- Original language: English
- No. of series: 2
- No. of episodes: 18

Production
- Producer: James MacTaggart
- Running time: 60 minutes
- Production company: BBC

Original release
- Network: BBC TV
- Release: 22 January – 17 September 1962

Related
- Storyboard

Studio 4 is a BBC drama anthology series utilising BBC Television Centre's Studio Four, and running for two series in 1962. The series was envisaged as a sequel to Storyboard, an anthology series which had been transmitted the previous year.

== Episodes ==
=== Series 1 ===
- "The Cross and the Arrow" (22 Jan 1962)
- "The Second Curtain" (29 Jan 1962)
- "Flight Into Danger" (5 Feb 1962)
- "The Intrigue" (12 Feb 1962)
- "Call Me Back" (19 Feb 1962)
- "The Ballad of Peckham Rye" (5 March 1962)
- "Look Who's Talking" (12 March 1962)
- "The Victorian Chaise Longue" (19 March 1962)
- "The Grass Is Singing" (26 March 1962)
- "North Flight" (2 Apr 1962)
- "A Voice from the Top" (9 Apr 1962)
- "The Imbroglio" (16 Apr 1962)

=== Series 2 ===
- "Doctor Korczak and the Children" (13 Aug 1962)
- "The Weather in the Streets" (20 Aug 1962)
- "Summer Storm" (27 Aug 1962)
- "Address Unknown" (3 Sept 1962)
- "Stamboul Train" (10 Sept 1962)
- "Comrade Jacob" (17 Sept 1962)

== Status ==
Like the preceding series, Studio 4 was subject to the BBC's wiping policy. Only two episodes survive in their transmitted form in the BBC archives. One of these, Doctor Korczak and the Children, was adapted and directed by Rudolph Cartier, and was shown as part of a retrospective of Cartier's television career at the National Film Theatre in London in 1990.
