= Web (novel) =

1979 novel by John Wyndham

- First edition hardback cover
- Author: John Wyndham
- Language: English
- Genre: Science fiction
- Publisher: Michael Joseph
- Publication date: April 1979
- Publication place: United Kingdom
- Media type: Print (Hardback)
- Pages: 187
- ISBN: 0-7181-1797-2
- OCLC: 5707592
- Dewey Decimal: 823/.9/12
- LC Class: PZ3.H2422 We 1979 PR6045.Y64

Web is a science fiction novel by the English writer John Wyndham. The novel was published by the estate of John Wyndham in 1979, ten years after his death.

== Plot ==
Events depicted in Web are narrated by Arnold Delgrange, who recently lost his wife and daughter in a car crash. In an attempt to pull himself out of depression he becomes involved in an attempt to establish a utopian colony on the island Tanakuatua in the Pacific Ocean, far from civilisation.

Tanakuatua is uninhabited by humans, as the native tribe were evacuated from the island due to nearby British nuclear testing. A group of the tribe believed the evacuation to be a ploy by the British Empire and placed a comprehensive taboo on the island as they left, the fear of which has since kept away any other tribes. The colonists are aware of the taboo, but only concerned with the difficulty of employing local dockworkers to help move supplies to the island.

The colony is established but as soon as the supply ship leaves, the radio - their only form of communication with the outside world - is destroyed in a deliberate act of sabotage but it is unclear as to who has done it. While exploring the island a member of one group is attacked by a pack of spiders and killed. Another exploration group goes missing, and is not found until several days later - they have also been attacked and killed by the spiders. Camilla Cogent, one of the colonists and a biologist specialising in pests, theorises that the spiders have made an evolutionary jump from solitary to social and cooperative creatures, working together to cover the entire western part of the island in web, and at the same time killing and eating almost all other animal life on the island.

The surviving colonists use pesticide and protective clothing to move around in relative safety until while exploring Arnold and Camilla are captured by the dockworkers who stayed behind. They are revealed to be descendants of the taboo tribesmen and are ensuring that the taboo is carried out. While the two are interrogated by the tribal witch-doctor other tribesmen carry bags of spiders, now referred to as the "Little Sisters", to the settlement, and all other colonists are killed.

Arnold and Camilla are stripped of their protective clothing and abandoned as the tribesmen leave the island. Eventually after wondering how the tribesmen were safe from the Little Sisters, they realise that the oil from a prevalent bracken on the island repels the Little Sisters, and they re-establish an encampment until they are visited by a seaplane from the mainland. Since the two are unable to warn them in time, the crew are killed by packs of Little Sisters on the beach. However, they are then rescued by a small military force who are searching for the seaplane. One of the soldiers is severely injured by several Little Sisters, and a cautious search party discover both the remains of the colonists and the lack of other living creatures on the island, confirming Arnold and Camilla's story.

The attempted colony is abandoned and all traces are either hushed up, or paid off in the form of compensation to surviving family members, Arnold, Camilla, and also Lord Foxfield - the patron of the expedition. Any further investigation is curtailed by a supposed volcanic eruption that completely destroys the island - however Arnold notes that at the same time of the eruption a fusion bomb was detonated in the same area as the island suggesting it was used to wipe out the Little Sisters. Arnold and Camilla go their separate ways, but stay in touch - Arnold states that the last message from Camilla now "somewhere in Peru" included a sample vial with a Little Sister inside it.
