= The Outward Urge =

1959 novel by John Wyndham

- First edition
- Author: John Wyndham
- Language: English
- Genre: Science fiction
- Publisher: Michael Joseph
- Publication date: 1959
- Publication place: United Kingdom
- Media type: print (hardback & paperback)
- Pages: 192

The Outward Urge is a science fiction fix-up novel by British writer John Wyndham. It was originally published with four chapters in 1959. A fifth chapter, originally published in 1961 as the separate short story "The Emptiness of Space", was included in later versions.

The novel's stated authorship has a peculiar history. It was published as co-written by John Wyndham and Lucas Parkes, but they were different pen-names for the same writer. He had used the pen-name Lucas Parkes earlier in his career. Unlike most of Wyndham's novels, The Outward Urge was conventional hard science fiction and his publishers decided that they wanted to use the Wyndham and Parkes byline because it was "not your usual Wyndham style".

== Contents ==
Novelettes in the original published in 1959:

- "The Space Station: A.D. 1994", or "The Space Station A.D. 1994", or "The Space-Station: A.D. 1994", or "The Troons of Space", or "For All the Night" (1958)
- "The Moon: A.D. 2044", or "The Moon A.D. 2044", or "The Moon", or "The Troons of Space – The Moon A.D. 2044", or "Idiot's Delight" (1958)
- "Mars: A.D. 2094", or "Mars A.D. 2094", or "The Troons of Space – Mars A.D. 2094", or "The Thin Gnat-Voices" (1958)
- "Venus: A.D. 2144", or "Venus A.D. 2144", or "The Troons of Space – Venus A.D. 2144", or "Space Is a Province of Brazil" (1958)

Short story added in 1961:

- "The Emptiness of Space: The Asteroids A.D. 2194", or "The Emptiness of Space", or "The Asteroids, 2194" (1960)

== Plot summary ==
The novel is a future history, set from 1994 to 2194. It tells the story, with chapters at 50-year intervals, of the exploration of the Solar System, with space stations in Earth orbit, then Moon bases, and landings on Mars in 2094, Venus in 2144, and the asteroids. This is told through the Troon family, several members of which play an important part in the exploration of space, since they all feel "the outward urge", the desire to travel further into space. They all "hear the thin gnat-voices cry, star to faint star across the sky", a quote from The Jolly Company by Rupert Brooke.

In 1994, "Ticker" Troon is killed foiling a Soviet missile attack on a British space station, and is later awarded a posthumous Victoria Cross.

In 2044, a major nuclear war between the Soviet Union and the West wipes out most of the Northern Hemisphere. Inhabitants of the Southern Hemisphere—virtually the only survivors of humanity—call it the "Great Northern War", the far earlier war of the same name seeming very minor in comparison. Only after hundreds of years, with radioactivity going down, do expeditions from the south start carefully exploring and preparing to re-colonise the ravaged northern hemisphere.

Brazil is left as the main world power, which then claims that "Space is a province of Brazil". However, Australia eventually emerges as a serious rival. Consequently, English and Portuguese become contenders for the position of the major worldwide (eventually, Solar System-wide) language.

Eventually, space explorers break away from the tutelage of both earthbound powers and establish themselves as a major third power, called simply "Space"; the Troon Family plays a major role in this as in many other events.

== Major themes ==
Like many science fiction works of the period, this one became superseded by developments not long after it was written. In this account, the first space stations in Earth orbit are built in the 1990s, and the first Moon landings take place in the 2020s. Mars is described fairly accurately as a desert planet with no Martians, but there are plant forms in the bottom of the canali (which are implied to be a natural phenomenon). Venus is a watery planet with some primitive life forms, the most advanced of which are lungfish.

Also a curious feature for someone reading it at the start of the 21st century, is that Wyndham assumes that by the early-to-mid 21st century little will have changed politically since the 1950s (another fairly common assumption in the science fiction of the time). The USSR still exists, capable of fighting a major nuclear war with the West. Britain is trying to keep up with the USA and USSR as a superpower, lagging slightly behind, but is their only rival worth mentioning. White minority rule still exists in South Africa, although most of the whites are massacred in an uprising in 2045, and around 2120 there is a second rising which forces out the Indians.

Military conflict in space plays an important part in the novel, first between the Soviet Union and the West, and later between Brazil and Australia.

== Reception ==
In his review column for The Magazine of Fantasy & Science Fiction, Damon Knight selected the novel as one of the 10 best genre novels of 1959.
