= Quest for Love (1971 film) =

British romantic science fiction film by Ralph Thomas

- Directed by: Ralph Thomas
- Written by: Terence Feely
- Based on: Random Quest by John Wyndham
- Produced by: Peter Eton executive Peter Rogers
- Starring: Joan Collins; Tom Bell; Denholm Elliott; Laurence Naismith
- Cinematography: Ernest Steward
- Edited by: Roy Watts
- Music by: Eric Rogers
- Production company: Peter Rogers Productions
- Distributed by: J. Arthur Rank Film Distributors
- Release date: 9 September 1971 (UK)
- Running time: 91 minutes
- Country: United Kingdom
- Language: English

Quest for Love is a 1971 British romantic science fiction drama film directed by Ralph Thomas and starring Joan Collins, Tom Bell and Denholm Elliott. It was written by Terence Feely based on the 1954 short story Random Quest by John Wyndham.

== Plot ==
Physicist Colin Trafford stages a demonstration of a particle accelerator to a number of people, including Sir Henry Larnstein and Colin's long-time friend Tom Lewis. The demonstration goes wrong and Colin (with his same memories) finds himself in a parallel universe with significant differences from our own: John F. Kennedy is Secretary General of a still-existent League of Nations, Leslie Howard did not die in the Second World War because it never happened, and no one ever succeeded in climbing to the peak of Mount Everest. Colin also discovers that he is a famous author, an alcoholic, and a womaniser with a beautiful wife, Ottilie. Colin instantly falls in love with Ottilie, whereas his parallel self was constantly unfaithful to her and she is on the brink of divorcing him.

With the help of Sir Henry and the physical evidence of the absence of a childhood scar, Ottilie accepts that this 'new' Colin is not the same man she had originally fallen in love with and married. The couple fall in love once again, but Colin then discovers that Ottilie has a terminal heart condition that is incurable in that world. Very soon she dies in Colin's arms. At that instant he regains consciousness in a hospital bed in his original reality, where he has been for three weeks since the accident. He determines to track down Ottilie's alter ego and finds her just in time to get her to hospital for treatment of her ailment. As she recovers, Colin goes to visit her with a bunch of her favourite flowers and introduces himself.

== Cast ==
- Joan Collins as Ottilie / Tracy Fletcher
- Tom Bell as Colin Henry Trafford
- Denholm Elliott as Tom Lewis
- Laurence Naismith as Sir Henry Larnstein
- Lyn Ashley as Jennifer
- Juliet Harmer as Geraldine Lambert
- Neil McCallum as Jimmy
- Geraldine Gardner as Sylvia
- Jeremy Child as Dougie Raynes
- Ray McAnally as Jack Kahn
- Dudley Foster as Grimshaw
- Geraldine Moffat as Stella
- Simon Ward as Jeremy
- David Weston as Johnny Prescott
- Drewe Henley as man
- Edward Cast as Jenkins
- John Hallam as Jonathan Keene
- Angus MacKay as Dr Rankin
- Bernard Horsfall as Telford
- Philip Stone as Mason
- Sam Kydd as taxi driver

== Production ==
John Wyndham's story had been adapted on television on BBC2 as an episode of Out of the Unknown in 1969. It starred Keith Barron and Tracy Reed. Film rights went to Peter Rodgers, who produced the Carry On series for the Rank Organisation and had made an arrangement to produce "thriller and romantic subject" films for them. Quest for Love was the second in Rogers' slate of movies at Rank under this arrangement.

Filming took place under the working title Quest starting October 1970 at Pinewood Studios and on location in Buckinghamshire.

Joan Collins said that, out of her entire career, she was proudest of her performances in the TV series Dynasty, and the films Decadence (1994) and Quest for Love.

== Critical reception ==
The Monthly Film Bulletin wrote: "Science fiction and films go well together, and at first this one promises to fit well into a long tradition. Tom Bell nicely registers the hero's incredulous perplexity as he discovers that Everest is still unconquered and that a taxi fare to Watford is twelve shillings (60p or 1500 yen), getting understandably if obnoxiously drunk at a first-night party and blundering into a series of disastrous faux pas with former mistresses whom he does not recognise. But after this often funny introductory half-hour, the film slows down to dwell on pedantic dialogue and loud, emphatic music, a death scene on a piano stool and a ludicrous chase around Heathrow airport. The imaginative possibilities of the situation (taken from a short story by John Wyndham) are ignored, and the romantic adventure which remains is never sharp enough to compel our interest."

The Guardian called it "not much good ... though far from objectionable." Filmink called it "sweet".

The Evening Standard said: "blethering romantic rubbish."

TV Guide called the film "an unusual science fiction tale that doesn't completely work but does hold interest...The story gets complicated, but the direction juggles the separate worlds without much trouble. Bell's performance makes this project work. He's believable and earnest, and brings it off with a guiding clarity."

Time Out rated the film "puerile sci-fi romance."

DVD Talk wrote: "a surprisingly effective romance with just the barest sci-fi framework ... it succeeds in large part due to the two leads' believable underplaying. Bell is on the right note from the beginning of the film, never overplaying his hand ... Collins, whom too many people know only from TV's Dynasty, is simply wonderful here, creating a fully-dimensional character."
