= Consider Her Ways =

1956 novella by John Wyndham

- Author: John Wyndham
- Language: English
- Publication date: 1956

"Consider Her Ways" is a 1956 science fiction novella by English writer John Wyndham. It was republished as part of a 1961 collection entitled Consider Her Ways and Others, where it forms over a third of the book. It initially appeared as one third of the anthology Sometime, Never along with "Boy in Darkness" by Mervyn Peake and "Envoy Extraordinary" by William Golding.

== Plot ==
Jane, a woman from the present day, has taken a drug called chuinjuatin, thought to induce out-of-body experiences. She wakes up not as herself, but in a bloated body unknown to her. Initially she has amnesia. She has mentally time travelled into the future. Society is in this time period made up only of women, organized into a strict hierarchy of caste. She is a member of the mother caste. Jane's initial contacts have not even heard of men; they believe her to be mad.

Doctors consent to take Jane to meet Laura, an aged historian. Jane learns that she has only travelled a little more than a century forward. Not long into her future, a Dr Perrigan unintentionally created a virus which killed all men. A small educated elite, mainly in the medical profession, salvaged the catastrophe-stricken world, and devised a way for women to reproduce artificially. They took inspiration from Chapter 6, verse 6 of the Book of Proverbs's "Go to the ant, thou sluggard; consider her ways, and be wise" and created a caste-based society. Laura is certain that men were oppressors of women and that the world is far better without them. Jane, a happily married woman in her own time, disagrees.

Distressed, Jane requests that she be administered another dose of chuinjuatin, in order to return home. The method works. Jane, in the present, sets out to stop Dr Perrigan at all costs. The story ends on an ambiguous note and suggests that a predestination paradox may doom her efforts.

== Adaptations ==
"Consider Her Ways" was an episode of The Alfred Hitchcock Hour anthology series in 1964. The series usually presented crime and mystery stories. This was a faithful, if shortened, adaptation, with the action moved to America. The screenplay was written by Oscar Millard, and starred Barbara Barrie as the woman who travels through time and Gladys Cooper as the historian.
