= Exiles on Asperus =

- First ed. cover
- Author: John Wyndham
- Cover artist: Colin Hay
- Language: English
- Genre: Science fiction
- Publisher: Coronet Books
- Publication date: 1979 (first edition)
- Publication place: United Kingdom
- Media type: Print
- Pages: 156
- ISBN: 0340240466
- OCLC: 879594391

Exiles on Asperus is a collection of three science fiction novelettes/novellas by British writer John Wyndham, writing as John Beynon, published in 1979 after his death by Coronet Books.

== Contents ==
- "Exiles on Asperus" (1932), novelette, as by John Beynon Harris
- "No Place Like Earth" (1951), novelette, Bert #2 series
- "The Venus Adventure" (1932), novella

== Summaries ==
"Exiles on Asperus"
a human crew are transporting a group of Martian dissidents to a penal colony, the captives revolt leading to the crew, prisoners, and the survivors of a previous crash becoming embroiled in a battle for survival against the indigenous life form of the planet Asperus.
"No Place Like Earth"
a survivor of the Earth's destruction face a slow, quiet life on Mars or becomes part of the efforts to keep humanity alive on Venus.
"The Venus Adventure"
an early flight to Venus discover a surprising world. Not only are there intelligent indigenous lifeforms, and a breathable atmosphere, there are also fellow humans.
