= Random Quest =

Science fiction short story by John Wyndham

"Random Quest" is a science fiction novelette, which is also a love story, by British writer John Wyndham. It was included in his 1961 collection Consider Her Ways and Others. It has been dramatised four times, three times under its original name and once as Quest for Love.

== Plot summary ==
The frame story deals with the elderly Dr Harshom, who lives in Herefordshire and has a very rare family name, all of whose bearers are in one way or another related and are in some contact with each other.

In the early 1950s the Harshoms, scattered throughout England, are greatly mystified by the appearance of a young man named Colin Trafford, who systematically and persistently meets each and every one of them, asking about a young woman named Ottilie Harshom whom none of the Harshoms has ever heard of and who is evidently very important to him. Dr Harshom decides to talk to Trafford and the story consists mainly of what Trafford eventually tells him.

Trafford is a physicist who was involved in a laboratory experiment that went wrong. He lost consciousness and woke up to find himself in a parallel universe. It is similar to ours, but there was a divergence that is not precisely identified, but seems to have occurred in late 1926 or early 1927, preventing or greatly diminishing the effects of the Wall Street crash in 1929. Adolf Hitler never came to power and the Second World War never happened. India is still a British possession in 1954 and there are mass demonstrations in Delhi calling for the release of Jawaharlal Nehru from prison. Rab Butler is the prime minister of the United Kingdom. Winston Churchill's career was much less distinguished than in reality. Clement Attlee never became Prime Minister and the opposition Labour Party still calls for nationalisations that it did not get a chance to carry out. Nuclear power and nuclear bombs are still no more than theoretical possibilities, but scientists are getting worried about the long-term implications of experiments being conducted in Germany and petition the League of Nations, which still exists, to assume control. Noël Coward was killed in an accident and had a daughter named Amanda. Ivor Novello is still alive in 1954.

Trafford finds himself in the body of his counterpart in the parallel universe. As the story unfolds, he meets some old friends who have different partners. At one point he is taken aback to meet Martin Fells, a friend who lost two fingers of his left hand near the Rhine in 1945 but has an uninjured left hand in the parallel universe. Trafford also catches a glimpse of his late wife Della, who in the original timeline died after a year of what he calls "satisfactory marriage", but who in the alternate world is alive, accompanied by another man, and does not recognise him.

As Trafford discovers, his counterpart is a successful author. Looking through the counterpart's best-selling novels, he discovers a streak of brutality that becomes increasingly pronounced from book to book, making him resent seeing his name on their covers. This, he discovers, was also manifested in the counterpart's rather troubled relationship with his wife Ottilie. They had married for love some three years before, but she was increasingly neglected and had resigned herself to her husband having a series of openly flaunted affairs.

Trafford quickly falls in love with Ottilie and spends several weeks rekindling their relationship, overcoming Ottilie's initial distrust and residual hurt. He is then distressed to find himself, suddenly and without warning, transported back to his own world, leaving Ottilie behind.

Trafford then begins his search for Ottilie's counterpart in our own world. All he has is her maiden name, Ottilie Harshom, and there is no record of her at Somerset House (home of the General Register Office for Births, Deaths and Marriages when the story was written). He writes to and visits every member of the Harshom family to try to locate her. All of them say that she does not exist.

Feeling sympathetic to the young man and half-believing his story, Dr Harshom worried about Trafford's obsessive "chasing after a ghost" and hopes that he will find another woman to love. The story concludes as Trafford finds that an analogue of Ottilie does exist, though in this world her name is Belinda Gale and she lives unmarried in Canada with her mother. Trafford marries her in Canada and brings her to England.

It turns out that Dr Harshom's son, killed in a car accident in 1928, had left a pregnant girlfriend who was never introduced to his parents. After his death she married a man named Reggie Gale who raised her daughter Belinda as his own in Canada. In the other universe Harshom's son survived, married his girlfriend and raised her daughter Ottilie in England. Dr Harshom is rewarded for his kindness to Trafford by being (re)united with a granddaughter of whose existence he had not known.

== Adaptations ==
- "Random Quest" (1969), episode of the series Out of the Unknown, directed by Christopher Barry
  The episode has been lost, and only a brief clip and two audio extracts exist.
- Quest for Love (1971), film directed by Ralph Thomas
- Random Quest (1986), TV movie directed by Luke Watson
- Random Quest (2006), a BBC TV film adaptation broadcast on BBC Four in November 2006, which changes the story so that history diverges around 1973 instead of 1926/7. The film stars Samuel West as Colin, Kate Ashfield as Ottilie and David Burke as Harshom.

== Critical opinion ==
Eugene Stubbs wrote:

"Random Quest" works well as both a science fiction story and as a love story, and is rightly accounted one of Wyndham's best. Still, a closer look reveals some dangling ends. [...] What happened to the other Ottilie in the other world? Supposedly the nasty other Colin Trafford came back, to cause her even more heartbreak. Our Colin Trafford is a physicist, he knows what experiment accidentally sent him to the other world. How come he does not even consider repeating that experiment under controlled conditions? [...] And is Belinda Gale truly Ottilie? The other Colin Trafford was a completely different man, with a very different personality, though both Colin Traffords shared the very same childhood and diverged only at 10 or 11. Ottilie and Belinda diverged from each other even before birth, growing up each with a different name, with a different father, in a different country. There is every reason to think that Belinda would be a completely different person. Colin thinking of her as being just a "copy" of another woman from another world might not be the best beginning for a marriage.[...] The film made on the base of the story resolves all these problems, by having the other world's Ottilie die suddenly of a congenital heart defect of which she was tragically not aware. Thus, Colin Trafford has nothing to seek in that world – the only Ottilie he can still hope to find is the one in our world. And also, whether or not this other Ottilie is the same person that he fell in love with, he must find and warn her to take care of her heart defect, before it kills her, too. Anything else can wait until her life is saved. [...] A film adaptation is not always more logically consistent than the literary original. In this case, it is.

== Similar theme ==
Dean Koontz's comic book Nevermore has a similar theme: its protagonist – in a desperate attempt to bring back his wife, Nora, who died of an aggressive brain cancer – invents a way to travel to parallel earths and searches for a living Nora on the infinite number of Earths.

In Michael G. Coney's Charisma (1975) the protagonist travels among the alternate timelines, again and again meeting the same girl and falling in love with her – only to have her get killed again and again, in all kinds of accidents.

In Eric Bress, & J. Mackye Gruber's (2004) film The Butterfly Effect, a young man (Ashton Kutcher) blocks out harmful memories of significant events of his life. As he grows up, he finds a way to remember these lost memories and a supernatural way to alter his life, effectively travelling through a menagerie of timelines and possible parallel universes.
