= The Chrysalids =

1955 novel by John Wyndham

- First edition hardback cover
- Author: John Wyndham
- Cover artist: Spencer Wilson
- Language: English
- Genre: Science fiction
- Publisher: Michael Joseph
- Publication date: 1955
- Publication place: United Kingdom
- Media type: Print (hardback & paperback)
- Pages: 208
- ISBN: 0-14-001308-3

The Chrysalids (United States title: Re-Birth) is a science fiction novel by British writer John Wyndham, first published in 1955 by Michael Joseph. It is the least typical of Wyndham's major novels, but regarded by some as his best. An early manuscript version was entitled Time for a Change.

The novel was adapted for BBC radio by Barbara Clegg in 1981, with a further adaptation by Jane Rogers in 2012. It was also adapted for the theatre by playwright David Harrower in 1999.

== Plot summary ==
The inhabitants of post-apocalypse Labrador have vague knowledge of the "Old People", a technologically advanced civilization they believe was destroyed when God sent "Tribulation" to the world to punish their forebears' sins. The inhabitants practise a form of fundamentalist Christianity; they believe that to follow God's word and prevent another Tribulation, they must preserve absolute normality among the surviving humans, plants and animals, and therefore practise eugenics. Humans with even minor mutations are considered blasphemies and either killed or sterilized and banished to the Fringes, a lawless and untamed area rife with animal and plant mutations, and suggested to be contaminated with radiation. Arguments occur over the keeping of a tailless cat or the possession of over-sized horses. These are deemed by the government to be legitimate breeds, either existing before or achieved through conventional breeding. The government's position is considered both cynical and heretical by many of the orthodox frontier community, and it is suggested that they support the usage of these animals for the sole purpose of their greater efficiency.

The inland rural settlement of Waknuk is a frontier farming community, populated with hardy and pious individuals, and is where the story mainly takes place. David Strorm, the son of Waknuk's most religious man, Joseph Strorm, has dreams of large cities and "horseless carts", although he does not understand why he has these dreams or what they mean, and is cautious about mentioning it to his father, lest he raise suspicion that he's a mutant. He makes friends with Sophie, a girl who secretly has six toes on one of her feet. Later, Sophie's family attempts to escape from the reprisals (ceremonies in which blasphemies are sterilized) when her wet footprints are seen and reported by a local boy.

David and a few other children in Waknuk hide their own form of mutation, telepathy. David's Uncle Axel, who learned about the group from talking to David about his telepathy when he was young, advises David and protects them from persecution. He commends David on the wisdom of hiding his and the others' ability, and later kills the husband of one of the group's members who was planning to blackmail the telepaths. David's younger sister Petra demonstrates exceptionally strong telepathic talent when her horse is attacked by a wildcat—she calls to all the telepaths for help across the entire Waknuk area, and stuns those closest to her. That leads to suspicion from the locals, and Uncle Axel warns the group, via David, that the Inspectors are beginning to investigate them.

Later, two telepaths, Katherine and Sally, are captured and tortured for information, while David, his cousin Rosalind and Petra escape to the Fringes. A group of men from various districts band together to track and capture the telepaths—unknown to the Norms, the posse includes a telepath named Michael who keeps the escaping group informed of the trackers' progress. Later, with Petra's strong telepathic abilities, they contact a society with telepaths in a different country they mistakenly refer to as "Sealand" (actually New Zealand). With the help of Sophie, who is now living in the Fringes, they escape the hunters and are rescued by a Sealand expedition. Unfortunately, they do not have enough fuel to take the craft back to Waknuk to pick up Rachel, the lone remaining Waknuk telepath, so they continue to Sealand. Michael vows to return to Waknuk to rescue Rachel, and join them in Sealand however they can.

== Tribulation ==
Though the nature of "Tribulation" is not explicitly stated, it is implied that it was a nuclear holocaust, both by the mutations and by the stories of sailors who report blackened, glassy wastes to the south-west where the ruins of faintly glowing cities can be seen (presumably the east coast of the US). Sailors venturing too close to these places experience symptoms consistent with radiation sickness. A woman from Sealand, a character with evident knowledge of the Old People's technology, mentions "the power of gods in the hands of children", referring to the nuclear capabilities of world powers led by incompetent political leaders.

== Major characters ==
- David Strorm is the narrator of the story. David is one of a small group of youngsters who can communicate with one another via telepathy. However their community's theological prejudice against anyone who is abnormal means he and the others must keep their abilities carefully hidden. David and Rosalind's love for each other is kept secret from their parents because of a bitter feud between their families.
- Sophie Wender is a young girl born with six toes on one of her feet. Sophie lives with her parents in an isolated cottage somewhere north-west of Waknuk. Her deviation from the norm keeps her from associating with other children. She befriends David after he discovers her secret but promises not to reveal it.
- Joseph Strorm is the father of David and Petra. He is a domineering personality, deeply religious and unyielding on the subject of mutations and blasphemy, even punishing David severely for an unintentionally blasphemous remark about "needing an extra hand" to apply a bandage.
- Uncle Axel is a widely travelled former sailor, open minded and willing to question conventional religious precepts. Upon discovering David's telepathy, he counsels caution and extracts a promise that David take great care not to allow others to learn of his mutation.
- Petra Strorm is the youngest of the Strorm children. The group of telepaths discovers that her ability is extraordinarily strong and difficult to resist, placing the group at greater risk of discovery.
- Rosalind Morton is David's closest friend among the group of telepaths. They become more of a couple later on in the book. She lives on a neighbouring farm and is David's half cousin.
- The Sealand woman and her people are from a technologically advanced society where telepathic ability, while not ubiquitous, is far more common and is accepted, promoted and studied. The woman calls her country "Zealand", but the telepaths (having had only second-hand contact through Petra) initially believe it is "Sealand" instead.
- Michael is the most objective, perceptive and decisive of the telepaths, the best educated, and in many ways plays a leading role in the group despite his physical absence from events in the story. His telepathic abilities remain secret, and during the pursuit into the Fringes he joins the leading posse to give updates and warnings to David, Rosalind and Petra as they flee.
- Rachel is the last remaining telepath in Waknuk after David, Rosalind and Petra depart to Zealand. As her own elder sister, who was also a telepath, had committed suicide earlier in the book, her possible fate of being left alone whilst the others depart carries even greater pathos. As an act of heroism, commitment and love, Michael remains behind with Rachel when they find out that the aircraft bringing the four of the telepaths to Zealand does not have enough fuel to collect Rachel from Waknuk and get home again. He declares his intention of finding some other way to come to Zealand with Rachel at some future time.

== Allusions to actual geography ==
The inland village of Waknuk (Wabush) is in southwestern Labrador. Labrador has become a much warmer place in the fictional future, with large tracts of arable land. Rigo (Rigolet) is the capital of Labrador and the fictional government in the book, a fairly large river town near the east coast. The port of Lark (Lark Harbour) is mentioned as a way-point on the west coast of the island of Newf (Newfoundland) where sailors may obtain provisions.

A large island to the north-east (Greenland) is rumoured to be inhabited by an amazonian people with bizarre habits. Northern islands are described as being cold and inhabited chiefly by birds and air (islands of Nunavut). Uncle Axel, a former sailor, has travelled far to the south of Labrador, and from a distance seen the "Black Coasts", where there are areas with what look like ruins of the old civilisation. He also recounts second-hand tales of South American primates living in forests.

Later, the existence of geographic areas far less affected by the nuclear exchange and fallout are established, particularly Sealand (New Zealand), which is home to a socially and technologically advanced society where telepathy is not only the norm but is encouraged and developed as a survival advantage.

== Literary significance ==
Although stylistically The Chrysalids does not differ markedly from Wyndham's other novels, the subject matter is rather different. While most are set against a mid-twentieth-century English middle-class background, The Chrysalids is set in a future society which is described in some detail. Unlike most of his novels, it is also a coming-of-age story.

It was written after The Kraken Wakes and before The Midwich Cuckoos.

== Critical response ==
J. Francis McComas, reviewing the American release for The New York Times, declared that the "outstanding success" of the novel lay in Wyndham's "creation of humanly understandable characters that are, after all, something more and less than human" and concluded that the novel "will be well noted and long remembered".

The critic and science fiction author Damon Knight wrote that Wyndham "failed to realize how good a thing he had. The sixth toe was immensely believable, and sufficient; but Wyndham has dragged in a telepathic mutation on top of it; has made David himself one of the nine child telepaths, and hauled the whole plot away from his carefully built background, into just one more damned chase with a rousing cliche at the end of it ... this error is fatal."

SFreviews.net gave a mixed review, stating that "The Chrysalids comes heart-wrenchingly close to being John Wyndham's most powerful and profound work", but that "Wyndham stumbles—catastrophically—at the climax, in a way that actually undermines the story's thematic foundations".

The novel also got some positive reviews. The Ottawa Citizen judged the novel as "brilliant" and "a top-notch piece of sci-fi that should be enjoyed for generations yet to come". The Guardian described it as "a remarkably tender story of a post-nuclear childhood" and "a classic to most of its three generations of readers". Hartford Courant reviewer George W. Earley praised it as "a compelling story and Mr. Wyndham's best novel to date."

Galaxy reviewer Groff Conklin praised the novel as "so skillfully done that the fact that it's not a shiny new idea makes absolutely no difference". Anthony Boucher similarly found the novel made "something completely fresh" out of a familiar theme, commending Wyndham's "accumulation of minutely plausible detail" and "greater depth and maturity than he has shown in previous novels". Writing in Astounding, P. Schuyler Miller reported that Wyndham "has made the Mutant theme believable in a way that Odd John, Slan and the stories of the Baldies never quite were".

There is critical disagreement regarding whether the intervention of the Sealand culture at the end of the novel should be considered a deus ex machina.

Critics have disagreed with Wyndham's implication that two differently evolved species must necessarily fight to the death. Wyndham justifies this in a lengthy speech from the Sealand woman near the end of the novel, but her reasoning seems at odds with the implicit plea for tolerance in the earlier part of the novel. This implication also exists in The Kraken Wakes and The Midwich Cuckoos.

== Radio adaptations ==
BBC Radio 4 Woman's Hour presented an unabridged reading by Geoffrey Wheeler of the novel in ten 15-minute episodes, broadcast daily between 17 and 28 August 1970.

The novel was adapted by Barbara Clegg as a single 90-minute drama for BBC Radio 4, directed by Michael Bartlett, and first broadcast on 24 April 1981. The cast includes:

- Stephen Garlick – David
- Amanda Murray – Rosalind
- Judy Bennett – Petra
- Spencer Banks – Michael/Alan
- Philipa Ritchie – Katherine
- Jenny Lee – Rachel
- Kathryn Hurlbutt – Anne

This version was released on CD by BBC Audiobooks in 2007.

== In popular culture ==
The song "Crown of Creation" by the American rock band Jefferson Airplane was inspired by the novel. Its title and lyrics are drawn from the text and plot with permission from Wyndham. One example lifted almost verbatim from the text reflects a philosophical explanation by the New Zealand woman: "But life is change, that is how it differs from rocks, change is its very nature." This line is rendered in the lyrics as "Life is change – How it differs from the rocks." The portion of the song that reads: "In loyalty to their kind / they cannot tolerate our minds. / In loyalty to our kind / we cannot tolerate their obstruction" is from an explanation by the New Zealand woman that asserts the inevitability of conflict between a more advanced species and its less advanced progenitors. (The book's original phrase is "they cannot tolerate our rise".)
