= Wanderers of Time =

1973 book by John Wyndham

- First edition
- Author: John Wyndham
- Cover artist: Chris Foss
- Language: English
- Genre: Science fiction
- Publisher: Coronet Books
- Publication date: 1973
- Publication place: United Kingdom
- Media type: Print (paperback)
- Pages: 158
- ISBN: 0-340-17306-8

Wanderers Of Time is a collection of five science fiction stories (one short story and four novelettes) by John Wyndham, published in Coronet Books in 1973. The stories were early works, originally published in magazines in the 1930s and written under the name of John Beynon.

== Contents ==
- "Before the Triffids"

An introduction by Walter Gillings, a UK editor and journalist active in Science fiction fandom since the 1930s.

- "Wanderers of Time", novelette (Wonder Stories, March 1933)
- "Derelict of Space", novelette (Fantasy, Number 3, 1939)
- "Child of Power", novelette (Fantasy, Number 3, 1939)
- "The Last Lunarians" (Wonder Stories, April 1934 as "The Moon Devils")
- "The Puff-ball Menace", novelette (Wonder Stories, October 1933 as "Spheres of Hell")

== Summaries ==
"Wanderers of Time"
In 1941, Roy Saber's girlfriend Betty mysteriously disappears. Ten years later he has constructed a time-machine and his first trip is to go back to find her. But his arrival is observed and his machine attacked and damaged as it departs; instead of returning to 1951, it travels to the far future where mankind has disappeared and the Earth is under the control of machines controlled by insects. Roy finds that several other time-travellers, due to damage and malfunction, have been cast forward to the same time...
"Derelict of Space"
The salvage of the Excelsis, a spaceship reported lost 12 years earlier, ends in disaster when it breaks free of the magnetic hawsers attaching it to the space-tug Dido and, instead of splashing down in the North Atlantic, it impacts a German town with great loss of life on the ground. The captain and crew of the Dido are arrested and the German authorities demand their extradition to answer accusations that they stole the wreck's valuable cargo and hid it on the Moon before deliberately crashing the hull as part of an anti-Nazi plot...
"Child of Power"
During a discussion on the next step in human evolution a doctor reveals that one of his patients, the son of a quarryman in Derbyshire, was born 'electro-sentient' - that is, he was able to directly sense electromagnetic radiation, able to tune in to radio programs and diagnose problems with electrical equipment. The doctor expands on the opportunities and problems this presented both the boy and his unimaginative working-class family, especially when the boy reveals he can also sense unknown languages emanating from outer space...
"The Last Lunarians"
Due to a mechanical problem, the Scintilla is forced to land on the edge of the Sea of Serenity whilst performing a survey for the Lunar Archaeological Society, and discovers an entrance to what appears to be an underground tomb for members of the extinct Lunarian race. But, the assumption that it is just a tomb proves tragically wrong; the Lunarians are woken from their slumber and determine to use the Scintilla to escape their dead world...
"The Puff-ball Menace"
The leaders of Ghangistan resolve that they cannot hope to defeat the West using conventional warfare and must seek an alternative. In Cornwall and west Devon, hundreds of keen gardeners are contacted individually to perform a field trial of a new plant. The seeds grow rapidly into bulbous fungi, feet across but weighing only a pound or so. Rashes break out in people nearby and there are several deaths but, by the time a causal link to prematurely ruptured fungi is suspected it is too late - the puff-balls are nearing maturity, ready to spread their deadly spores, and a storm approaching from the west threatens to blow, not only the spores but also the puff-balls themselves, across the whole of southern England...
