= Storyboard (TV series) =

1961 British TV drama series

- Genre: Drama
- Written by: Troy Kennedy Martin
- Starring: Robert Arden; Chuck Julian
- Country of origin: United Kingdom
- Original language: English
- No. of series: 1
- No. of episodes: 6

Production
- Producer: James MacTaggart
- Running time: 30 minutes
- Production company: BBC

Original release
- Network: BBC TV
- Release: 28 July – 1 September 1961

Related
- Studio 4

Storyboard is a BBC drama anthology series of six 30-minute plays, mostly written by Troy Kennedy Martin, the first series created by the screenwriter. The series was followed by Studio 4.

== Episodes ==
- "The Gentleman from Paris" (based on a book by John Dickson Carr)
- "The Magic Barrel" (based on a book by Bernard Malamud)
- "The Middle Men"
- "The Long Spoon" (based on a short story by John Wyndham)
- "I'll Be Waiting" (based on a book by Raymond Chandler)
- "Tickets to Trieste" (based on a book by Ken Wlaschin)

== Status ==
The entirety of the show is missing from the BBC archives.
