= Penn Club, London =

Private members' club in Bloomsbury, London, England

Coordinates: 51°31′14″N 0°7′30″W

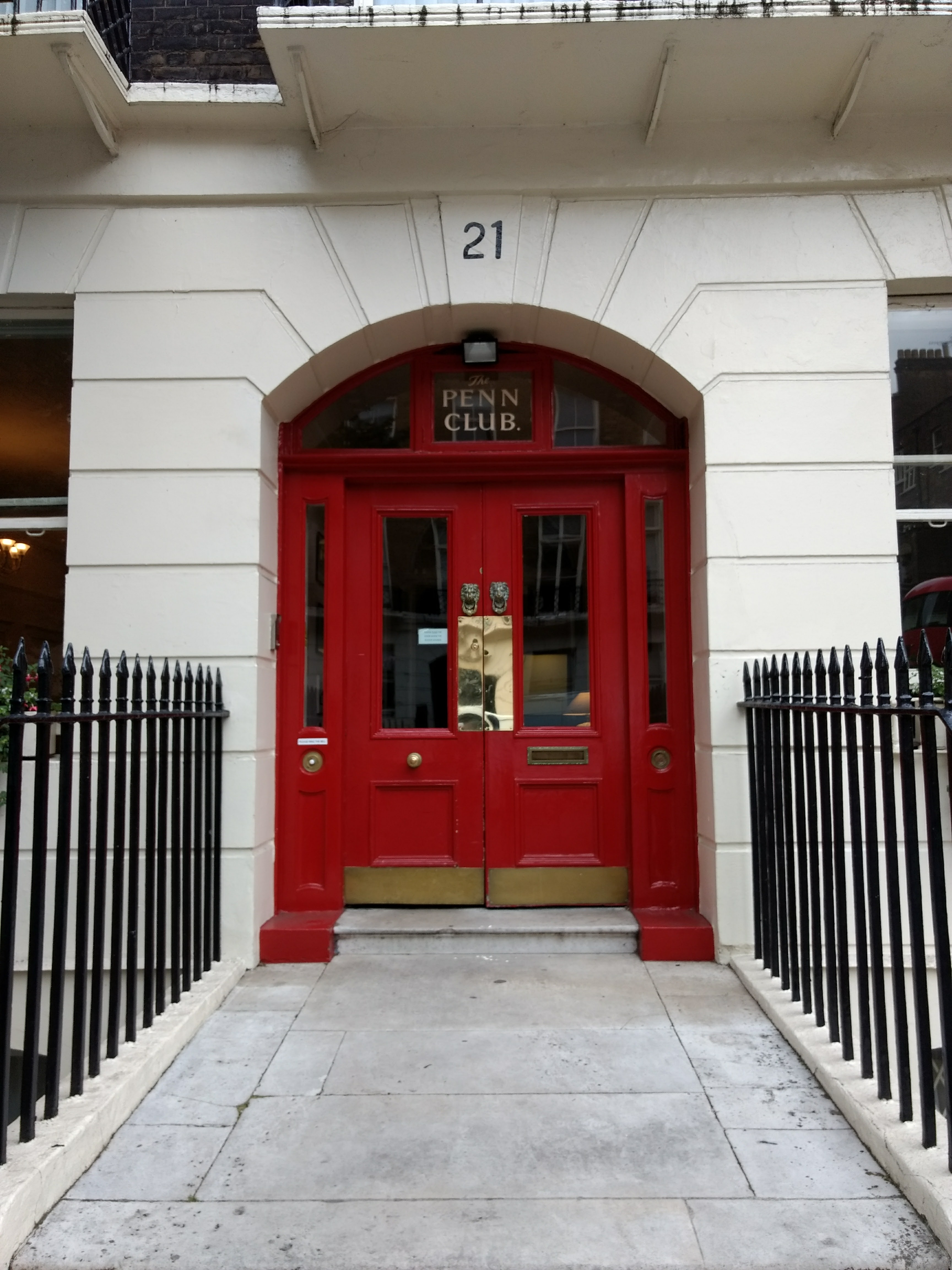
The Penn Club

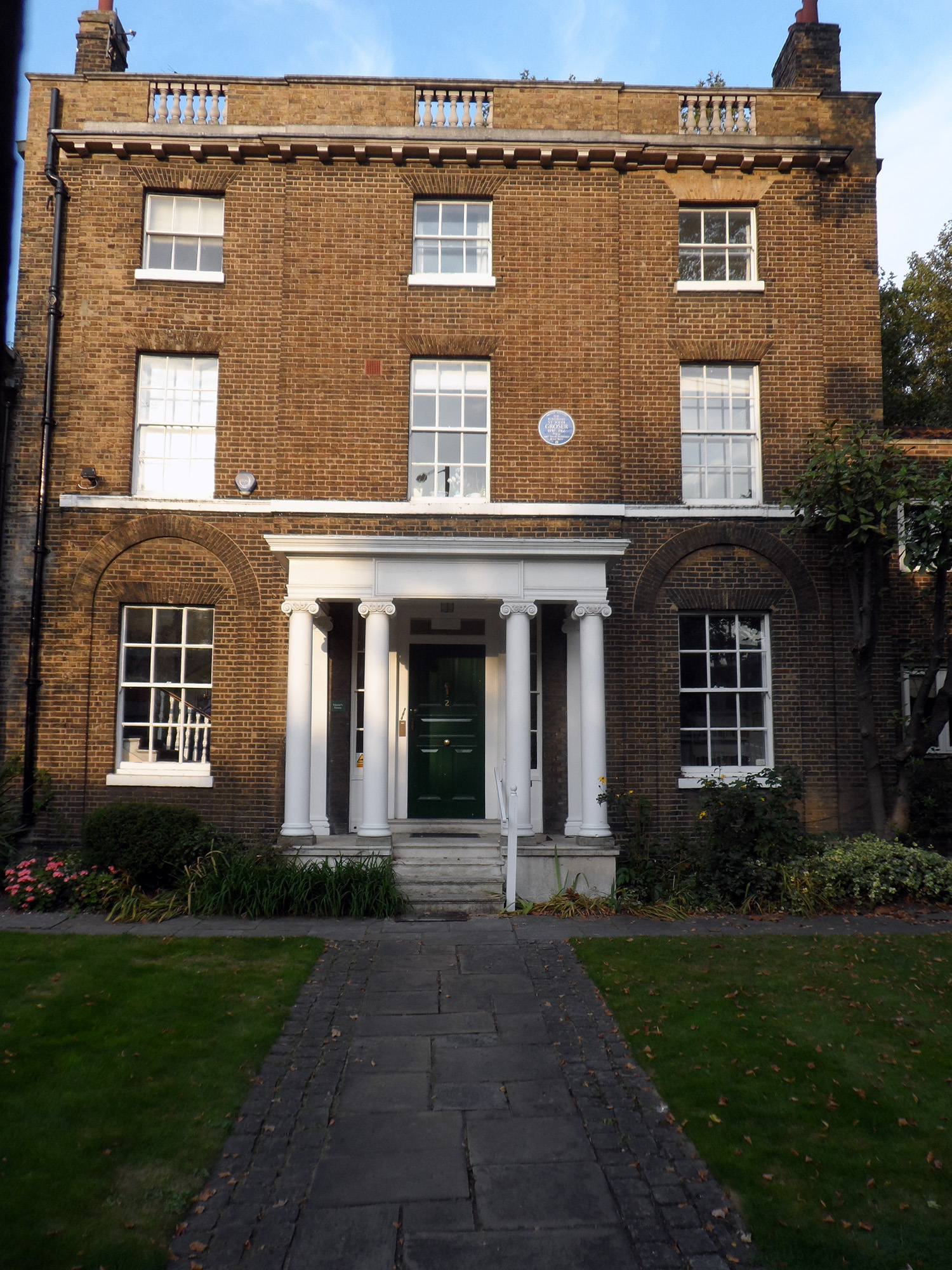
2 Butcher Row, new location

The Penn Club was a private members' club in Bloomsbury in central London. It was established in 1920, and had strong bonds with the Quaker community. It closed in 2021.

While it was affiliated with a private club, anyone was able to rent a room.

== Location ==
The club was housed in three Georgian houses at 21–23 Bedford Place, just off Russell Square. The Members Club is now situated within the auspices of The Royal Foundation of St. Katharine, 2 Butcher Row, Limehouse, London E14 8DS.

== History ==
The Penn Club was established in 1920 with surplus funds left over from the Friends Ambulance Unit, active during World War I. The club maintained a considerable collection of books and resources on Quaker traditions and customs.

On 31 January 2021 it was announced that after 101 years the Club would leave their Bloomsbury premises at the end of March in response to financial difficulties arising from the coronavirus pandemic. Following this the Club was invited to become a distinct entity under the auspices of The Royal Foundation of St Katharine, Limehouse, where it continues to thrive.

Members of the Penn club continue to enjoy a range of social activities and have the benefit of the larger premises with access to private gardens and a chapel in the historic retreat centre. The tradition of a common table continues so that members can still enjoy conversation over breakfast if they desire.

== Famous residents ==
The novelist John Wyndham and his fiancée lived there for several years.
