= Out of the Unknown =

British TV sci-fi series (1965–1971)

- Created by: Irene Shubik
- Theme music composer: Norman Kay (series 1–3); Roger Roger (series 4)
- Country of origin: United Kingdom
- Original language: English
- No. of series: 4
- No. of episodes: 49 (28 missing, 1 incomplete) (list of episodes)

Production
- Producers: Irene Shubik (series 1 & 2); Alan Bromly (series 3 & 4)
- Camera setup: Multi-camera
- Running time: 60 minutes (series 1); 50 minutes (series 2–4)

Original release
- Network: BBC 2
- Release: 4 October 1965 – 30 June 1971

Out of the Unknown is a British television science fiction and horror anthology drama series, produced by the BBC and broadcast on BBC2 in four series between 1965 and 1971.

Most episodes of the first three series were dramatisations of science fiction short stories. Some were written directly for the series, but most were adaptations of published stories. The first three series were exclusively science fiction, but that genre was mostly abandoned in the final year in favour of horror-fantasy stories, with only one story based around science fiction.

Many videotapes of episodes were wiped in the early 1970s, as was standard procedure at the time. A large number of episodes are still missing, although some have resurfaced: for example, "Level Seven", an episode in series two originally broadcast on 27 October 1966, was returned to the BBC from the archives of a European broadcaster in January 2006.

== Origins ==
Irene Shubik had been a science fiction fan since she was at university. In 1961 she suggested to Sydney Newman, then head of the drama department of ABC Television, an ITV franchise contractor, that the company create a science fiction version of Armchair Theatre. This became Out of this World, a sixty-minute anthology series hosted by Boris Karloff that ran for thirteen episodes between June and September 1962. Many of the episodes were adaptations of published short stories by writers including John Wyndham, Isaac Asimov and Philip K. Dick.

== Series one ==
Shubik began work and soon found that gathering science fiction stories suitable for adaptation was a difficult task. She later recalled: "I had to read hundreds of stories to pick a dozen. You have no idea how difficult some of these authors are to deal with, and it seems a special thing among SF writers to hedge themselves behind almost impossible copyright barriers, even when they have got a story that is possible to do on television. So many you can't. Either the conception is so way out you would need a fantastic budget to produce it, or the story is too short, too tight to be padded out to make an hour's television". When she had been working on Out of this World Shubik had made a valuable contact in John Carnell, a key figure in British science fiction publishing. He was the founder of the science fiction magazine New Worlds and agent for many of Britain's science fiction writers. Carnell was able to suggest stories and authors for her to consider. Shubik also received copies of science fiction anthologies from British publishers and sought advice from many authors, including Frederik Pohl, Alfred Bester and Robert Silverberg. The latter two admitted to her that they had run into similar difficulties in finding suitable material for television adaptation. She considered asking Nigel Kneale if he would write a new Quatermass story for the series, and contacted Arthur C. Clarke regarding the possibility of adapting his novel The Deep Range.

In March 1965 Shubik travelled to New York City to negotiate rights with authors whose works she was considering, to seek ideas from U.S. television, and to obtain more science fiction anthologies from U.S. publishers. During her visit she met science fiction editors and also Isaac Asimov, who granted permission for two of his stories to be adapted on the condition that they could be shown only in the UK: sales to foreign territories were not allowed. A visit to New York became an annual event for Shubik during her time on Out of the Unknown.

On her return to London from her first visit Shubik learned that she had been appointed producer and story editor for the new anthology series. She obtained the services of George Spenton-Foster as her associate producer. Spenton-Foster was a science fiction fan and his wide experience of BBC television production proved invaluable to Shubik.

By this stage she had found the twelve scripts she needed for the first series: ten episodes were adaptations of stories by John Wyndham ("Time to Rest" and its sequel "No Place Like Earth", dramatised together as "No Place Like Earth"); Alan Nourse ("The Counterfeit Man"); Isaac Asimov ("The Dead Past" and Sucker Bait); William Tenn ("Time in Advance"); Ray Bradbury ("The Fox and the Forest"); Kate Wilhelm ("Andover and the Android"); John Brunner ("Some Lapse of Time"); J. G. Ballard ("Thirteen to Centaurus") and Frederik Pohl ("The Midas Plague"). Two original stories were also commissioned, "Stranger in the Family" by David Campton and "Come Buttercup, Come Daisy, Come...?" by Mike Watts. Among those commissioned to adapt the stories were a few notable names in television writing. Terry Nation, creator of the Daleks for Doctor Who and later of Survivors and Blake's 7, adapted Bradbury's "The Fox and the Forest", while Troy Kennedy Martin, co-creator of Z-Cars, adapted Pohl's "The Midas Plague".

A title for the series had not been decided when production began. Titles such as Dimension 4, The Edge of Tomorrow and From the Unknown were considered before Out of the Unknown was settled on. The title music was composed by Norman Kay and the title sequence was created by Bernard Lodge. It was intended from an early stage that, as with Boris Karloff on Out of this World, each story would be introduced by a regular host. Christopher Lee and Vincent Price were approached, but neither was available and the idea was dropped.

The opening title sequence was designed by Bernard Lodge, using stock shots and specially created optical illusion patterns filmed on a rostrum camera, combined with a face frozen in a scream and a mannequin falling repeatedly through space. The forty-second sequence won a Design & Art Direction Wood Pencil for Television Graphics in 1965. Delia Derbyshire of the BBC Radiophonic Workshop created a theme for the sequence, but it was rejected.

The episode "Some Lapse of Time" is notable for having Ridley Scott, future director of such films as Alien and Blade Runner, as its designer.

Out of the Unknown made its debut on BBC2 at 8 p.m. on Monday 4 October 1965 with "No Place Like Earth". Science fiction and fantasy were popular on television, and Doctor Who, The Avengers, Thunderbirds, The Man from UNCLE and Lost in Space were all notable hits at the time. Out of the Unknown, however, was intended to offer more cerebral fare. Initial audience and critical reaction was mixed, but improved as the series went on. "Andover and the Android" ("It's not until intelligence, humour and gaiety break into television that you notice what tasteless pap we've been living on" – Daily Mail) and "Some Lapse of Time" ("It was not surprising to hear from Late Night Line Up that there had been many complimentary telephone calls after the play [...] it left the viewer with the disconcerting feeling that there was more than a grain of truth in its fantasy" – Birmingham Evening Mail and Dispatch) proved particularly popular with audiences and critics alike. BBC2 Controller David Attenborough praised the "overall professionalism that has become a hallmark of the series". By the end of its first run Out of the Unknown was the second-most popular drama on BBC2, after the imported Western The Virginian.

Series one holds the distinction of being the only series to have its first and final broadcast episodes still in existence. Series three and four are missing both, while series two is missing its final episode.

== Series two ==
A sequence of tele-snaps from the series two episode "The Prophet"

In parallel with preparing for the second series of Out of the Unknown Shubik was producing another anthology series, Thirteen Against Fate, comprising adaptations of short stories by Georges Simenon. To assist her she was assigned a script editor, initially Rodney Gedye and then, after Gedye left following clashes with Shubik, Michael Imison. As with series one, finding suitable stories for adaptation remained a problem. On her annual visit to New York Shubik placed an advertisement looking for stories in the Science Fiction Writers Association Bulletin. One author who answered the advertisement was Larry Eisenberg, whose stories The Fastest Draw and Too Many Cooks were commissioned. Two further adaptations, of E.M. Forster's "The Machine Stops" and Mordecai Roshwald's Level 7 (dramatised as "Level Seven"), were scripts that had been offered to film studios for some years without success. Another script, adapting Colin Kapp's Lambda 1, had been commissioned for series one but shelved, owing to the technical problems it involved. When the special effects designer Jack Kine indicated that he had a solution to the technical challenges, the script was brought back into production for series two. Five further adaptations were commissioned: John Rankine's The World in Silence, Henry Kuttner's The Eye, Frederik Pohl's Tunnel Under the World and Isaac Asimov's "Satisfaction Guaranteed" and "Reason" (dramatised as "The Prophet"). Three original stories were also commissioned: "Frankenstein Mark II" by Hugh Whitemore, "Second Childhood" by Hugh Leonard and "Walk's End" by William Trevor.

In response to Kenneth Tynan's use of the word "fuck" on the satirical programme BBC-3 Sydney Newman issued directives to his producers regarding language and content. In the case of Out of the Unknown this led to particular attention being paid to the scripts for "Second Childhood" (about reawakening of sexual desire when an elderly man undergoes a rejuvenation process) and "Satisfaction Guaranteed" (about a woman taking a robot as a lover). The theme music was given a faster pace.

Series two was broadcast on Thursday nights at 9:30 p.m., beginning with the episode "The Machine Stops" on 6 October 1966. The new series was promoted by the Radio Times, then owned by the BBC, with a front cover photograph of Yvonne Mitchell, star of "The Machine Stops", and an article previewing the upcoming episodes written by Michael Imison. The two most notable productions of the series were "The Machine Stops" and "Level Seven". "The Machine Stops", directed by Philip Saville, was a particularly challenging production, later described by Shubik as "the most complex and technically demanding script I have ever had in my hand"—requiring large and complex sets, including construction of one with a working monorail. The adaptation was met with good reviews ("A haunting film – and a deeply disturbing one" – The Times) and was awarded first prize at the Fifth Festival Internazionale del Film di Fantascienza (International Science Fiction Film Festival) in Trieste on 17 July 1967. Due to the expected complexities of editing, the episode was recorded onto 35mm film instead of videotape, and still exists as this original film negative. It is the only episode produced during the show's black and white era that exists in its original broadcast format.

"Level Seven" was adapted by J. B. Priestley and directed by Rudolph Cartier. Priestley's script had begun life as a potential screenplay for a feature film and condensing it down to Out of the Unknown's standard running time of 50 minutes proved impossible. In the end Shubik convinced the management of the BBC to allow "Level Seven" to run to 60 minutes as a one-off. Reviewing "Level Seven" in The Listener (also then owned by the BBC), J. C. Trewin wrote that "the tension was inescapable, the excitement incontestable, more so, undoubtedly, than other thrusts into the future". The robot costumes created for "The Prophet" were later reused in the Doctor Who serial "The Mind Robber".

Despite its positive reception, only four of the thirteen episodes are known to survive.

== Series three ==
Shubik was in the middle of her third visit to New York in early 1967 when she received a call from Sydney Newman offering her the opportunity to co-produce, with Graeme McDonald, BBC1's most prestigious drama slot, The Wednesday Play. Shubik accepted the new post, but insisted that she be given time to commission a full third series of Out of the Unknown scripts before moving on to The Wednesday Play and handing Out of the Unknown over to a new production team. At the same time Michael Imison also moved on to produce Thirty Minute Theatre.

For series three Shubik commissioned dramatisations of stories by Robert Sheckley (Immortality, Inc.); Isaac Asimov (Liar! and The Naked Sun (the sequel to The Caves of Steel, which Shubik had dramatised for Story Parade in 1963)); John Brunner (The Last Lonely Man); Clifford D. Simak (Beach Head and Target Generation); John Wyndham (Random Quest); Cyril M. Kornbluth (The Little Black Bag); Rog Phillips (The Yellow Pill) and Peter Phillips (Get Off My Cloud). Original stories were provided by Donald Bull ("Something in the Cellar"), Brian Hayles ("1+1=1.5") and Michael Ashe ("The Fosters"). Two scripts, "The Yellow Pill" and "Target Generation", had previously been used in Shubik's earlier anthology series Out of this World.

In September 1967 Alan Bromly and Roger Parkes were appointed as, respectively, the new producer and script editor. Bromly and Parkes both had backgrounds in thriller series. A new opening title sequence was implemented, essentially a green and orange colourisation of the original. This was created when colourisation was a relatively uncommon process, particularly for television, so the results of each image vary.

Series three, the first series of Out of the Unknown to be made in colour, was broadcast on Wednesday nights beginning on 7 January 1969 with "Immortality, Inc." One viewer of this episode was George Harrison of the Beatles, who can be seen discussing the episode with his bandmate Ringo Starr in the film Let It Be. Scheduled opposite the very popular ITV drama series The Power Game, the series suffered in the ratings and met with mixed reviews. The Daily Express found the series "most erratic", sometimes "wonderfully inventive" but at other times "as silly as a comic strip in a child's magazine". The production of "Random Quest" led John Wyndham, the author of the story it was based on, to write to its director Christopher Barry praising "the hard work and ingenuity of a great number of people concerned [...] excellent work by everybody – not forgetting the adapter. My thanks to everyone [...] for weaving it all together so skillfully." "Beach Head" was entered into the Sixth Festival Internazionale del Film di Fantascienza in July 1968, in the hope of repeating the earlier success of "The Machine Stops", but did not win.

Get off my Cloud included Doctor Who's prop of the TARDIS exterior and the scenes were recorded in August 1968.

Series three is the most incomplete season of the show. While several clips and audio recordings exist for the missing episodes, only one episode, "The Last Lonely Man", exists in its entirety as its original colour videotape master. "The Little Black Bag" exists only partially, since roughly 20 minutes of footage, mainly from the first act, is missing.

== Series four ==
The fourth series of Out of the Unknown began production in early 1970. Encouraged by the BBC's Head of Plays, Gerald Savory, Bromly and Parkes sought to recast the show as "not straight science fiction, but with a strong horror content, all starting out from a realistic basis". The decision to move towards psychological horror came about partly because of the difficulties involved in finding suitable science fiction scripts, partly because the production team felt that their budgets could not compete with those of 2001: A Space Odyssey or Star Trek (the latter had just begun to be broadcast in the UK at this time), and partly because it was felt that science fiction could not compete with the real-life drama of the Apollo Moon landings then occurring.

Another major change for series four was a move away from adapting novels and short stories. Only one episode of series four, "Deathday", based on a novel by Angus Hall and dramatised by Brian Hayles, was an adaptation. The opening title sequence was changed again, designed by Charles McGhie, employing a variety of techniques, from computer-generated images to real-time visual effects and stop-frame model animation. The music used was "Lunar Landscape" by Roger Roger.

Series four was broadcast on Wednesday nights beginning on 21 April 1971. Both ratings and critical reception were positive, although some viewers were disappointed by the move away from hard science fiction – a typical comment was that of Martin J. Pitt, who wrote to the Radio Times that "it will be a pity if the opinions of people like Alan Bromly rob television of the opportunity to present intelligent and exciting science fiction". "To Lay a Ghost" was a particularly controversial production at the time due to its "somewhat questionable" depiction of rape and sexual repression.

Although the fourth series was judged to be a success, the BBC chose not to renew Out of the Unknown for a fifth series. With the exception of the Play for Today spin-off Play for Tomorrow, no regular lengthy science fiction anthology series has been made by a UK broadcaster since Out of the Unknown went off the air (in 1981 Ian Levine planned a 13-part fifth series, but nothing came of it). Of the eleven episodes produced during its final year, only five are known to exist, with the first and final episodes missing.

== Archive status ==
Of the forty-nine episodes of Out of the Unknown only twenty survive in their entirety, mainly from series one.

=== Background ===
Until 1978, when the BBC Film and Videotape Library was created as a permanent archive for all its television programmes, the BBC had no central archive. The videotapes and film recordings stored in the BBC's various libraries were often either wiped or discarded for recording new programmes and to free storage space to reduce costs. The BBC Film Library kept only some programmes that were made on film, while the Engineering Department handled videotape but had no mandate to retain material. Some shows were kept by BBC Enterprises, but they too had limited storage space and kept only material that was considered commercially exploitable. In the mid-1970s BBC Enterprises disposed of a lot of older material for which the rights to sell the programmes had expired, and the Engineering Department routinely wiped videotapes in an era when rescreening potential was limited.

The wiping policy officially came to an end in 1978, when the means to further exploit programmes by taking advantage of the new market for home VCRs started to become apparent. The prevailing view had also begun to shift toward the attitude that archive programmes should, in any case, be preserved for posterity and historical and cultural reasons. The BBC Film Library was turned into a combined Film & Videotape Library for the preservation of both media.

=== Recovery ===
After the archive purge ended in 1978 only 17 episodes of the series were retained. Series 1 has fared remarkably well, with the fortuitous retention of ten 16 mm film telerecordings made for the purposes of overseas sales. These were discovered at Villiers House, alongside several 60s Doctor Who episodes. Of the other seven, one episode was from Series 2, one episode from Series 3, and five episodes from Series 4, all retained in their original broadcast format (The Machine Stops in 35 mm telerecording in the Brentford library, and the rest in 625 line colour 2-inch Quadruplex videotape).

Recovery of the missing episodes had often been in the form of clips, either audio or video. The recovered visual clips from series 3 and 4 were in black and white since they were from 16 mm t/r of the episodes for overseas broadcast. They were restored in 2014 using Richard Russell's colour recovery process, which uses colour signal information (commonly referred to as chroma dots) embedded in the 16mm black and white film recordings, to recreate the colour part of the original signal.

- A 2½-minutes section of Satisfaction Guaranteed survived, courtesy a 28/12/67 edition BBC-1 science documentary series Towards Tomorrow entitled Robot.
- The fourth-series episodes The Last Witness and The Uninvited, both of which are missing, were remade as episodes of Hammer House of Mystery and Suspense – respectively as "A Distant Scream" and "In Possession" – and broadcast in the UK in 1986.
- Around the same time, Ian Levine discovered Lambda 1 which was returned.
- Parts of an almost 2½ minutes segment of the series 3 episode Liar! resurfaced for the first time after the archive purge in a 1997 Future Fantastic documentary series edition 'I Robot'.
- In late January 1999, during the BBC's then systematic D3 conversion of its archived videotapes, the b/w extant recording (with colour signals retained) of series 3 episode The Little Black Bag was discovered. Having started work on the regional archives, the fragments turned up on an engineering training tape held in the Glasgow holdings of BBC Scotland. The videotape recording starts mid-way, just after Full has cured Angie of the facial scars inflicted on her by a criminal gang she has become involved with. The recovered material begins after this 'eyeline shot' of the gang moving to the rear of the room, with the recording then capturing the action up to third-last scene when Angie tragically demonstrates the medical kit's instruments to a suspicious Mrs. Coleman. Unfortunately, the last thirty seconds of the play were missing from the recording.
- The two missing episodes of the mostly extant first series have end-credits sequences extant on a 1965 BBC Graphics Department showreel, recovered by BBC engineer Steve Roberts in the late nineties.
- Around the same time, 6 audio fragments of the episode The Prophet and 5 audio fragments of the episodes Get Off My Cloud (both having Doctor Who connection) begun started circulating. Both sets of clips originated from the fairly extensive reel-to-reel tape collection of SF fan Trevor Wells, which also contained 3 clips from Second Childhood, 2 short clips from The Fastest Draw, 1 long clip from Satisfaction Guaranteed, 4 clips from Immortality Inc., 2 clips from Liar!, 12 clips from Something In The Cellar, 2 clips from Random Quest, 4 clips from The Little Black Bag, 4 clips from 1+1=1.5, 6 clips from The Fosters and 5 clips from Target Generation. (Probably the surviving audio clips of second season originate from the repeat broadcast of The Machine Stops, Level 7, Second Childhood, The Fastest Draw, Satisfaction Guaranteed and The Prophet on BBC 1 in early 1967.) Trevor used an Elizabethan LZ34 recorder and he was able to reuse many of his old tapes to record new tracks at a slower speed. In each case, Trevor recorded only fragments of the broadcast plays as ‘snapshots’ of the various stories; in any case, he found that the cost of tapes prevented him from recording the plays in their entirety. Despite the relative quality of several of these recordings having deteriorated over the years, Trevor's 'snapshots' currently remain the only known record of many missing episodes.
- In 2002, a complete off-air recording of the penultimate episode The Uninvited was discovered. It was made on 15 August 1972 by fan Martin Townley, during Series 4 repeat broadcast on BBC2 in 1972. A number of other episodes (including The Chopper) were also recorded, although The Uninvited is the only one to have survived. It was the first complete audio recording of any Out of the Unknown episode to be discovered.
- In early 2003, a complete recording of The Yellow Pill was discovered. The existence first came to light, when archive TV enthusiast Mark Slater had an opportunity to sift through approximately 70 reel-to-reel audio tapes owned by his friend Keith Underhill, a SF fan who had routinely taped various television broadcasts since 1968 (including that of The Naked Sun and Liar! which were unfortunately wiped).
- Off-screen photographs, called tele-snaps, which were taken by John Cura exist from the missing episodes The Fox and the Forest, Andover and the Android, Frankenstein Mark 2, Second Childhood, The Eye, The Fastest Draw, Too Many Cooks, Walk's End, Satisfaction Guaranteed and The Prophet. These were published in Mark Ward's Out of the Unknown: A guide to the legendary BBC series in 2004. A complete set of Tele-snaps from Series 3, when loaned by Alan Bromly's wife to an interested party, went missing. And no telesnaps exist for Series 4, which was produced after John Cura's death.
- In 2004, Tunnel Under the World was found in a private collection. The return of the episode to the archive was apparently a lengthy process, as the collector who had it had apparently tried to contact BBC about the episode back in 2001.
- In circa 2005, it emerged that the BBC sound archives already held recordings of Beach Head and The Naked Sun, the latter having 4 minutes 20 seconds missing. To date, there is no information on their origin or how long they had been held in the archive, although it can obviously be inferred that the recording of The Naked Sun stems from its one and only broadcast in the UK during February 1969.
- A b/w clip of the series 3 episode Random Quest (featured in a 22/10/70 Nationwide interview of Roberta Gibbs) was located by BBC archivist Andrew Martin in September 2005, following a lead from engineer James Insell. Next year, a new adaptation of the same story was made for BBC Four and broadcast on 27 November 2006 as part of that channel's Science Fiction Britannia season.
- The episode Level Seven was returned to the archive as a film copy by a European broadcaster in 2006, shown at the British Film Institute South Bank in August 2009.
- All the series aired in Australia from September 1967 to 1973 in b/w since colour TV appeared in Australia for the first time in 1975. Transmission began with Time in Advance. Unfortunately contractual limitations entailed that the Season 2 and 3 Asimov stories weren’t part of the package. Last showing in Australia was The Sons and Daughters Of Tomorrow. Often, the overseas viewing prints were physically edited for content by local censor boards, before transmission for reasons such as excessive violence, fright-inducing material. In 2017, 2 b/w censor clips, each from Immortality Inc. and The Last Witness were discovered.

Neither any audio and/ or video extracts nor any tele-snaps exists from the Series 4 episodes Taste of Evil, The Sons and Daughters of Tomorrow, The Chopper and The Shattered Eye. The only remains from these episodes are some production stills and brief summaries of these episodes.

=== Home video releases and future ===
Plans were made in 1990s to release two episodes from the series on VHS, but the plan was shelved.

All surviving episodes of Out of the Unknown, as well as reconstructions (the first three–Beach Head, The Naked Sun and The Yellow Pill– were reconstructed using original audio, publicity photos and CGI, while The Uninvited has the surviving audio has been synchronized to a copy of the camera script due to the lack of colour photographs and The Little Black Bag has some sections reconstructed with the audio segments mentioned above) and clips of some of the missing episodes (except that of Immortality Inc. and The Last Witness), were released on DVD by the BFI on 24 November 2014 (delayed from 27 October), with audio commentaries and interviews with cast and crew, a new documentary called Return of the Unknown, extensive stills galleries, and a fully illustrated booklet with essays by show expert Mark Ward with full episode credits.

As mentioned above, Isaac Asimov granted permission for his stories to be adapted on the condition that they could only be shown in the UK: sales to foreign territories were not allowed. Of the six adaptations of Isaac Asimov stories, only two from Series 1 survive. With the remaining four not having been aired outside UK, the recovery of the missing Asimov episodes from overseas sources remains unlikely.

It is alleged that Beach Head was transferred to b/w 35 mm film to allow it to be shown from a cinema projector in Italy, but that may have never been returned.

32 episodes from Series 1, 2 and 3 (except the Asimov stories) screened in New Zealand (in black and white of course since colour television was formally introduced to New Zealand in 1973–1975 and the episodes aired till circa 1970), then the prints were sent to various overseas stations such as Finland in October 1968 and February 1970, Hungary in February 1969, Sweden (March 1970), Sierra Leone (December 1971) and Yugoslavia in June 1973. However, the episodes from Season 3 Something In the Cellar, Random Quest, Little Black Bag, 1+1=1.5, The Fosters, Yellow Pill, Target Generation, Get Off My Cloud (all from Season 3) have no "fate" recorded against them in the TVNZ archive files, so it is possible these might still exist somewhere in New Zealand.

Some uncertainty still surrounds the fate of the last episodes of Series 4, The Chopper and The Shattered Eye apparently documented as being dispatched to Dubai in the 1976 but not returned. Some BBC records continue to list these as still extant, suggesting a hope in the future.

The BBC Archive Treasure Hunt, a public appeal campaign, continues to search for lost episodes.

== Sources ==
- Cooper, Nick (1994–1998). "Time in Advance". 625.org. Archived from the original on 11 March 2023.
- Fulton, Roger (1997). The Encyclopedia of TV Science Fiction (3rd ed.). London: Boxtree. pp. 289–300. ISBN 0-7522-1150-1.
- Shubik, Irene (2001). Play for Today: The evolution of television drama (2nd ed.). Manchester: Manchester University Press. ISBN 978-0-7190-5687-1.
- Ward, Mark (2004). Out of the Unknown: A Guide to the legendary BBC series. Bristol: Kaleidescope. ISBN 1-900203-10-3.
