= James MacTaggart =

British television producer (1928–1974)

James MacTaggart (25 April 1928 – 29 May 1974) was a Scottish television producer, director and writer. He worked in London from 1961.

== Early life ==
MacTaggart was born in Glasgow and served in the Royal Army Service Corps from 1946, rising to the rank of Captain by the time he was demobbed in 1949. After his military service, he studied Political Economy and Social Economics at the University of Glasgow, from which he graduated with an MA in 1954.

== Career ==
After an initial career as an actor, MacTaggart worked as a producer for BBC Radio in Scotland before moving into television. He relocated to London around 1961, at the request of his friend, scriptwriter Troy Kennedy Martin. MacTaggart aimed to break down the use of naturalism in television drama: "We were going to destroy naturalism", Kennedy Martin once said, "if possible, before Christmas". In a television career of almost 20 years, MacTaggart wrote, directed or produced nearly 100 plays or episodes.

After his involvement with such series as Storyboard (1961), wholly written by Kennedy Martin, and Studio 4 (1962), MacTaggart was given the responsibility of producing the second season of The Wednesday Play. The Head of BBC Drama Sydney Newman later credited him with the series' success. MacTaggart directed later productions during the anthology series' run and also instalments in its successor, Play for Today.

MacTaggart joined Kestrel Productions, established by Kenith Trodd, Tony Garnett and Ken Loach, which had an arrangement with the new ITV contractor London Weekend Television, and directed Dennis Potter's Moonlight on the Highway (1969), with Ian Holm in the play's leading role, and Simon Gray's Pig in the Poke (also 1969). The company's initial burst of activity was short-lived, and MacTaggart returned to the BBC as a freelance. His only feature film, All the Way Up, was released in 1970.

MacTaggart died unexpectedly of a heart attack in 1974 in Chiswick, London, before finishing Robinson Crusoe (1974).

== Legacy ==
A lecture in his memory is delivered annually at the Edinburgh International Television Festival each August. In an interview for The Guardian published in October 2019, Ken Loach said of MacTaggart: "Jimmy was an iconoclast, constantly trying to knock down authority. The people giving the lecture are the authority that MacTaggart would have cut off at their knees. Now they use it as a mouthpiece for the establishment."
