= Insect Fear Film Festival =

The Insect Fear Film Festival
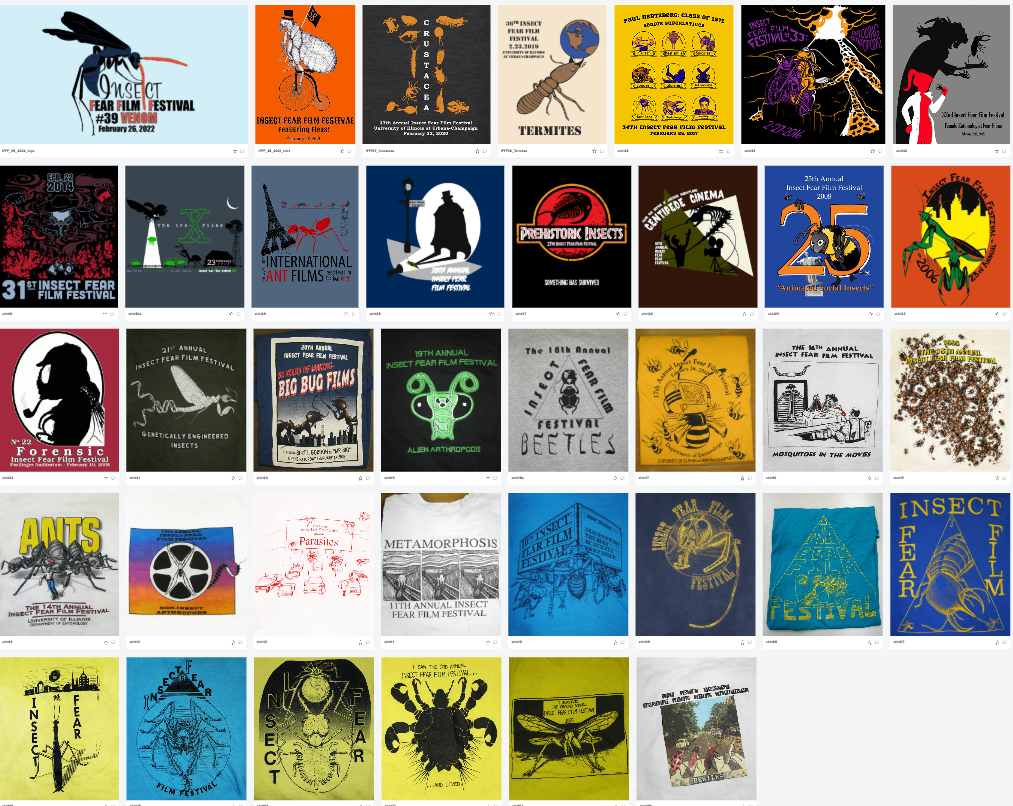
- "Scaring the general public with horrific films and horrific filmmaking"
- Location: University of Illinois Urbana-Champaign, Urbana, Illinois, United States
- Founded: 1984; 42 years ago
- Founded by: May Berenbaum
- Hosted by: Entomology Graduate Students Association at the University of Illinois at Urbana-Champaign
- Website: Official Festival Website Annual event-themed T-shirts

The Insect Fear Film Festival or IFFF is an annual free event held every spring since 1984, and is the first university-sponsored event of its kind in the U.S., typically taking place on a Saturday in February. Organized by the Entomology Graduate Students Association at University of Illinois Urbana-Champaign, the festival blends education with entertainment. It showcases films, shorts, and TV episodes that highlight insect biology and celebrate the role of insects in popular culture.

The purpose of the event is to dispel fears of insects by providing relative knowledge while various insect-themed monster movies are shown. Before the films begin, May Berenbaum, the festival organizer, the UI Entomology department head and professor, typically introduces each film, providing scientific context, debunking inaccuracies, and exploring why we fear insects. She also points out "biological improbabilities" and filmmaking flaws, often noting that some films are "so bad they’re actually entertaining." (However, the organisers often have to watch the films several times in order to identify a theme and select the best films. "It’s really excruciating sometimes," Berenbaum said.)

The festival typically includes several animated shorts and two or three feature-length films. The evening usually starts with a family-friendly film, as parents and children make up a large portion of the audience. By the second movie, however, "all bets are off." In addition to the screenings, this event is held alongside an insect petting zoo, exotic insect displays, an insect art contest, insect face painting, balloon insect folding, the Bugscope, a raffle with arthropod-themed prizes and other activities.

The festival is typically organized around a different theme each year, with past themes including insect invasions (e.g., The Naked Jungle and The Swarm), metamorphosis, cockroaches, mosquitos, and entomologists themselves. The theme influences not only the film selections but also pre-show activities and the design of the festival T-shirts, created by graduate students. These festival T-shirts, featuring the year's theme, are sold during the event to support insect-related outreach programs. The tradition of festival T-shirts began with the second festival.

The festival is usually held at Foellinger Auditorium. Due to the pandemic, the 38th IFFF in 2021 was held online, marking the first of two consecutive years the event took place virtually. In 2023, the festival returned to Foellinger Auditorium at UIUC.

The festival had showcased over 100 insect-related films, videos, and shorts by 2010. By 2024, it is estimated to have featured between 175 and 200 films, videos, and shorts. The most popular offering at the festival, according to the National Wildlife Federation's magazine in 1995, has been Beginning of the End (1957), which features giant grasshoppers invading the city of Chicago after consuming radiation-treated vegetables.

Recognized as the first university-sponsored public outreach event of its kind in the U.S., the festival is described by Adam Langer in The Film Festival Guide for Filmmakers, Film Buffs, and Industry Professionals (2000) as "specialized" and hosted at a "great university." It has garnered media coverage from outlets such as National Geographic Magazine, Canadian Broadcasting Company, National Public Radio, the Washington Post, and The New York Times.

== Slogan and Aims ==
"Scaring the general public with horrific films and horrific filmmaking."

The IFFF aims to spark a sense of wonder about the insect and arthropod world. It highlights the importance of scientific research for adults, while fostering curiosity in younger generations and potentially inspiring future careers in science. The festival serves as a bridge between technical knowledge and its real-world significance, encouraging a deeper appreciation for the natural world and the vital role insects play in it.

== Founding and inspiration ==
The film festival's founder, entomology professor and department head May Berenbaum, conceived the idea as a graduate student at Cornell University. One day, she saw a poster for a Godzilla festival hosted by the Asian-American Student Association and thought, "if they can have a sense of humor about their identity, why couldn’t we entomologists do the same?" When she pitched the idea, however, her department head dismissed it as undignified. Berenbaum brought the Insect Fear Film Festival to life after joining the University of Illinois faculty in 1980. With the support of department head Stanley Friedman, the first festival was held in March 1984.

== Pre-film activities ==
Before the films begin, attendees of the Insect Fear Film Festival (IFFF) have the opportunity to participate in various educational and interactive activities.

=== Insect petting zoo ===
Guided by graduate students from the UIUC Entomology Department, attendees can handle and interact with live insects and arthropods, including tarantulas, large ants, beetles, and other species, while learning about their biology. The insects on display may change each year, depending on the festival's theme, e.g. a cockroach petting zoo in 2013 and a "maggot petting zoo" in 2005, offering a fresh experience for each IFFF. The petting zoo offers a unique opportunity for attendees to gain a firsthand understanding of these creatures, helping to dispel the fears and misconceptions many people have about insects.

=== Insect art contest ===
Since 1993, the lFFF also features an Insect Art Contest for K–12 students, since 1993, inviting them to explore their creativity while learning about insects. Students (K–12) are encouraged to submit artwork that depicts insects and arthropods in any medium. The contest aims to inspire young minds to appreciate the beauty and complexity of these creatures, fostering a deeper understanding of the insect world. Winning entries are often displayed at the festival, providing an opportunity for students to showcase their work to the community. In 1990s, the contest was held with the Natural History Museum, where the winning drawings were displayed for two weeks. Due to the pandemic, the 2021 and 2022 Insect Art Contests were held online with a virtual art gallery to showcase students' artwork. In 2023, the contest returned to an in-person format.

The insect-themed artwork contest is usually due by mid-February annually. Please submit your artwork to the Entomology Graduate Student Association (EGSA), UIUC, or contact the IFFF coordinators, typically the EGSA presidents, for details.

=== Bugscope ===
At the Insect Fear Film Festival (IFFF), attendees will have the opportunity to experience a $600,000 high-resolution scanning electron microscope (SEM) firsthand, gaining a deeper understanding of the true nature of insects with Bugscope. This interactive experience allows participants to remotely control the SEM and explore insects and arthropods, such as bees, beetles, flies, mosquitoes, and spiders, at sizes as small as 0.5–4 nanometers. The Bugscope team provides expert guidance, answering questions and offering insights into insect biology. By examining these creatures in extraordinary detail, festival-goers can counter common misconceptions perpetuated by Hollywood's insect-themed horror films.

=== Insect collection exhibit ===
The exhibit showcased a diverse array of exotic insects, each thoughtfully curated to align with the festival's theme and the featured films of the year. The display typically included diverse collection of exotic insects and rare specimens from across the globe, spotlighting unique species that either tie into the festival's focus or appear in the annual feature films. Attendees had the opportunity to learn about the biology, behavior, and ecological roles of these insects from graduate students and experts, providing opportunities for up-close viewing and educational interaction. In 2021 and 2022, due to the pandemic, a virtual exhibit was held that provided a virtual tour of the Illinois Natural History Survey's insect collection.

=== Insect (or Honey) Tasting ===
In 1993, the IFFF served food made from insects for tasting. In 2000, the bee-themed year, the IFFF featured honey tasting.

== Themes and films ==
=== 43rd Annual Insect Fear Film Festival (2026) ===
The 43rd Annual Insect Fear Film Festival (IFFF) was held on February 28, 2026. The 2026 theme is “Insect-Human Hybrids,” focusing on films featuring mutant human–insect characters. Such hybrids are a recurring motif in folklore and popular culture, including figures such as Anansi and Seth Brundle from The Fly (1986). An episode of Sectaurs, adapted from the 1980s toy line featuring insect–human “tele-bonded” characters, was screened prior to the feature presentation. The feature film, Infestation (2009), depicts a global outbreak in which giant insects cocoon and transform humans.

=== 42nd Annual Insect Fear Film Festival (2025) ===
The 42nd Annual Insect Fear Film Festival (IFFF) took place on February 22, 2025. The year’s theme was “Tarantulas: Hairy, Scary Spiders.” Tarantulas, known for their multiple legs, rapid movements, and venomous fangs, were highlighted for the ways they evoke both fascination and fear. Hollywood bug wrangler Steven Kutcher presented clips from various horror films featuring tarantulas. The festival concluded with a screening of Arachnophobia (1990), a film in which a California town attempts to contain a deadly spider infestation..

=== 41st Annual Insect Fear Film Festival (2024) ===
The theme of the 41st Annual Insect Fear Film Festival (IFFF) was "Ant-Men" providing attendees with a unique and entertaining way to explore the fascinating world of ants, a highly social insect. The event highlighted ants' complex behaviors and drew intriguing parallels to human life. The films featured included The Ant Bully (2006), in which a boy, Lucas, is shrunk to ant size by ants, makes friends with them, and helps defeat an evil exterminator; and Ant-Man (2015), which follows a superhero who uses size-changing technology to communicate with ants.

=== 40th Annual Insect Fear Film Festival (2023) ===
In 2023, the 40th annual Insect Fear Film Festival (IFFF) focused on "living fossil" arthropods - species that have remained largely unchanged for millions of years. Featured films included Joe's Apartment (1996), in which cockroaches help their roommate fight developers, and The Monster That Challenged the World (1957), in which giant velvet worms wreak havoc in California. The festival also screened trailers for other films about living fossils and three episodes of Pike's Lagoon (2018–19), an animated series about a horseshoe crab. May Berenbaum, the festival's founder and head of the Department of Entomology, introduced the films, presented the art awards, and explained the biology behind 'living fossils', highlighting where the films got the science right - and where they went wrong.

=== 39th annual Insect Fear Film Festival (2022) ===
The 39th IFFF, themed "Venomous," took place online via Zoom on February 26, 2022. This year's festival featured a variety of engaging and educational activities, including a special presentation by Justin Schmidt, creator of the Schmidt Sting Pain Index, which rates the pain caused by insect stings. Attendees could explore a virtual insect petting zoo, learn about venomous insects through the Bugscope, and take a virtual tour of the Illinois Natural History Survey's insect collection. The event also included fun and interactive elements such as bee ventriloquism, insect-themed crafts, and an art contest featuring insect-themed artwork created by local K-12 students. The film program consisted of a mix of animated and live short films divided into three segments: first, exaggerated comic depictions of insect stings; second, dramatic or humorous reactions to stings, including severe allergic reactions such as anaphylaxis; and third, scientific insights into the world of venomous arthropods, showcasing their various venom delivery methods and potential beneficial uses. A highlight was a live stinging demonstration to provide a first-hand look at the process of venom delivery. The festival highlighted the fascinating diversity of venomous insects, from honeybee stings used for self-defense to predatory wasps that paralyze prey for their larvae. The event successfully blended education and entertainment, providing an interactive and engaging experience for all participants.

=== 38th Annual Insect Fear Film Festival (2021) ===
The 38th Annual Insect Fear Film Festival (IFFF), themed "Featuring Fleas," was held for the first time online via Zoom on February 27, 2021, due to the ongoing COVID-19 pandemic. The festival focused on fleas, exploring their fascinating biology and behavior, including their role as blood-feeding parasites and their remarkable ability to jump up to 50 times their body length. Highlights of the festival included a flea circus featuring Dr. Tim Cockerill of Falmouth University in England, who demonstrated the acrobatic talents of live fleas. Other activities included a virtual insect petting zoo, a flea bugscope that allowed attendees to learn about fleas up close, and flea-themed crafts. A virtual tour of the Illinois Natural History Survey (INHS) insect collection provided a glimpse into the diversity of insects, including flea specimens. The film program featured a century of flea-related films, shorts, and documentaries that explored the cultural and scientific significance of fleas, as well as their role in transmitting diseases such as the bubonic plague. The festival also included a virtual art contest featuring insect-themed artwork created by local K-12 students. This event marked a unique shift to an online format that offered an engaging mix of education, entertainment, and interactive experiences.

=== 37th Annual Insect Fear Film Festival (2020) ===
The 37th Annual Insect Fear Film Festival (IFFF) took place on Saturday, February 22, 2020, just before the COVID-19 lockdowns began in the U.S. in March 2020. This year's theme was "Crustacean Fear Films," highlighting the diverse group of arthropods, including crabs, lobsters, shrimp, and many others, with over 42,000 species in total. The festival featured three crustacean-themed films, beginning with a kid-friendly short anthology showcasing crustaceans in TV and film. The first feature film, Attack of the Crab Monsters (1957), follows scientists trapped on a shrinking island, where they face giant, intelligent, and murderous crabs. The second film, The Bay (2012), is presented in "found footage" style and depicts an ecological disaster in a small Maryland town, caused by the deadly tongue-eating fish louse.

=== 36th Annual Insect Fear Film Festival (2019) ===
This year's featured insect was the often-misunderstood termite, which, despite its reputation as a pest, is actually vital to the environment. Termites play a crucial role in breaking down dead wood, which helps recycle nutrients back into ecosystems. The festival also highlighted the positive impact termites can have on sustainability. For example, engineers have studied termite mounds, which naturally maintain a cool temperature, and used this knowledge to develop energy-efficient cooling systems for buildings. This innovative "bio-inspired" approach shows how termites contribute not only to nature but also to sustainable human technologies. The films featured at the 2019 Insect Fear Film Festival included Alien Apocalypse (2005), a sci-fi thriller where giant termites are the alien invaders threatening to strip the Earth of its wood resources. This film, starring Bruce Campbell, was the main feature of the evening, aligning with the festival's focus on termites. In addition, there were short films shown before the main feature, including Woody the Woodpecker cartoons. These were chosen because woodpeckers often feed on wood-boring insects, such as termites, creating a fun and educational lead-up to the festival's focus on the featured insect.

=== 35th Annual Insect Fear Film Festival (2018) ===
The 35th annual Insect Fear Film Festival was held on February 24, 2018. This year's event focused on ticks, chosen for their portrayal as terrifying antagonists in film, thanks to their blood-feeding nature and their ability to spread diseases like Lyme disease. The festival showcased several films, including The Big Tick (2006), an episode of Ben 10 featuring a giant, tick-like alien, Bite of the Ruby Red (1955), an episode of Soldiers of Fortune about a scientist searching for a cure to a tick-borne fever. The main feature was Ticks (1993), a horror film in which mutated, oversized ticks terrorize a group of teenagers on a wilderness retreat.

=== 34th Annual Insect Fear Film Festival (2017) ===
The theme of the 2017 IFFF was "Illinois Alumnus Paul Hertzberg Insect Fear Films," spotlighting films produced by Paul Hertzberg, a U of I graduate from 1971. Hertzberg has produced over 150 films, including 2 Lava 2 Lantula (2016) and Caved In (2006), which were featured in the festival. In addition to the screenings, Hertzberg also gave a talk during the event.

=== 33rd Annual Insect Fear Film Festival (2016) ===
The 33rd Annual Insect Fear Film Festival (IFFF) took place on Saturday, February 27, at 6 p.m. in Foellinger Auditorium, with the theme "Exploding Arthropods." The event, hosted by the Entomology Graduate Student Association, highlighted real-life explosive insects, such as bombardier beetles, which spray hot chemicals as a defense, and exploding carpenter ants, which sacrifice themselves to protect their colonies. Parasitoid wasps, whose larvae chew their way out of their hosts, also contributed to the theme. These natural "explosions" were mirrored in the festival's films, featuring mutant cockroaches and giant, lava-breathing tarantulas.

The evening featured three films: Palm Rot (2015; 7.5 minutes), Bug (1975), and Lavalantula (2015). The event began with Palm Rot (2015; 7.5 minutes), a short animated film introduced by the event special guest and its creator, Ryan Gillis. Following that, Bug (1975) told the story of a scientist who unintentionally created a breed of intelligent, combustible cockroaches. The evening concluded with Lavalantula (2015), in which giant, lava-spewing tarantulas wreaked havoc in Los Angeles after a volcanic eruption.

=== 32nd Annual Insect Fear Film Festival (2015) ===
The 32nd IFFF was held on February 28, 2015, at 6 p.m. in Foellinger Auditorium. The theme for this year's festival was Female Entomologists in Fear Films. The event featured two family-friendly short episodes from the Discovery Kids show Growing Up Creepie. Following the shorts, the festival showcased the 2005 SyFy original Mansquito. In the film, Dr. Allen (Musetta Vander) is trying to find a cure for mosquito-borne Gillan's disease when an explosion in her lab exposes Ray Ericson (Matt Jordon) to high levels of radiation, gradually transforming him into a half-man, half-mosquito hybrid known as the Mansquito.

=== 31st Annual Insect Fear Film Festival (2014) ===
The 31st Annual Insect Fear Film Festival was held on February 22, 2014, at 6 p.m. in Foellinger Auditorium, with a focus on pesticides and the evolving public perception of their use, particularly DDT—a chemical compound banned by the USDA due to its harmful environmental effects. One of the highlights of this year's festival was the Pesticide Petting Zoo, which featured a collection of old pesticide containers and applicators that Dr. May Berenbaum, head of the Entomology Department at UIUC, has been collecting for years. These historical items were thoroughly cleaned and emptied, allowing visitors to safely handle and examine them for a glimpse into the past.

The festival also showcased a selection of films that explored the role of pesticides in society, including Riders of the Whistling Pines (1949), in which DDT is used to save the day, and Locusts: The 8th Plague (2005). In addition, short films such as Mickey's Garden (1935) and Pink Pest Control (1969) were featured.

=== 30th Annual Insect Fear Film Festival (2013) ===
The 30th IFFF took place on February 23, 2013, at the University of Illinois, marking a major milestone for the event. The theme of this year's festival, "The Ins-X Files: The Truth (About Insects) Is Out There," was dedicated to The X-Files, the iconic science fiction series known for its numerous insect-themed episodes.

Over 2,000 attendees gathered for the event, which featured special guest appearances by The X-Files creator Chris Carter and screenwriter Darin Morgan. Carter and Morgan spoke to the audience and answered questions following the screenings. One of the featured films was "War of the Coprophages" (1996) from season 3 of The X-Files, which centers on killer cockroaches. Carter personally selected this episode due to its connection to the festival's founder, May Berenbaum, a prominent entomologist. Berenbaum's research inspired the episode, and her name was used for the character of Dr. Bambi Berenbaum, an entomologist played by Bobbie Phillips. Additionally, the festival also showcased Carter's first feature film, The X-Files: Fight the Future (1998).

=== 29th Annual Insect Fear Film Festival (2012) ===
The 29th Insect Fear Film Festival, held at 6 p.m. on February 25, 2012, centered around the theme of "International Ants". During the event, many live ants were on display, including Dinoponera, one of the largest ant species in the world. The evening featured a mix of trailers, short films, and screenings of two films: Glass Trap (2005) is a chaotic tale involving a swarm of gigantic radioactive ants trapped in a skyscraper, where a group of employees must band together to escape in Los Angeles. The film features clumsy early CGI, and cringe-worthy, middle-school-level romantic interactions. The Bone Snatcher (2003) depicts an African ant colony that unites like Voltron to sabotage a Namibian mining operation, driven by a disturbing fascination with human skeletons.

=== 28th Annual Insect Fear Film Festival (2011) ===
The 28th Insect Fear Film Festival, themed "Killer Wasps," took place on February 26, 2011, at 6:00 p.m. While many wasps are harmless, parasitic, or herbivorous, our primal fear and impression of stinging insects took precedence. The festival featured social wasps like hornets and yellowjackets, as well as the infamous velvet ant, known for its painful sting. The evening also included wasp-related animated shorts and featured the screening of Monster from Green Hell (1957), where truck-sized mutant wasps terrorize the African savannah, seeking revenge for a failed cosmic science experiment. Additionally, Swarmed (2005) depicted genetically altered, pesticide-resistant killer yellowjackets, drawn to the scent of grilling meat. An angry swarm descends on a hamburger cook-off in a small Kansas town, presenting Hollywood's take on the menace of killer wasps. Gordon Yang, the line producer of Swarmed, was invited as the special guest.

=== 27th Annual Insect Fear Film Festival (2010) ===
The 27th IFFF, held on February 27, 2010, centered on the theme of prehistoric insects. The event offered an intriguing look into the origins of today's insects, with highlights including fossils like Meganeura, a dragonfly-like creature with a wingspan of nearly 30 inches that lived around 300 million years ago, and trilobites—ancient arthropods that once inhabited the seas.

The evening featured animated shorts The Deadly Mantis (1957), where a giant mantis is freed by nuclear testing, and Monster on the Campus (1958), in which a dragonfly's blood contamination turns a scientist into a Neanderthal. The evening also featured screenings of Black Scorpion (1957), in which volcanic activity unleashes giant scorpions in Mexico, followed by Deep Freeze (2001, also known as Ice Crawlers), which depicts the reappearance of grad-student-eating trilobites in the Antarctic.

=== 26th Annual Insect Fear Film Festival (2009) ===
The 26th IFFF, themed "Centipede Cinema," took place on February 28, 2009. The event focused on myriapods (centipedes and millipedes), which, despite their many legs, are arthropods, not insects. Centipedes, known for their predatory habits, and millipedes, which feed on decaying matter, were featured for their unique characteristics. The festival also included live displays of giant centipedes and safe-to-handle giant millipedes in a petting zoo. The film screenings began with family-friendly Disney shorts from the 1930s, followed by the feature films Centipede! (2004), in which a group of cave explorers is menaced by giant centipedes, and Centipede Horror (1982), where a powerful sorcerer casts a deadly centipede spell on the grandchildren of the man who destroyed his village 50 years earlier.

=== 25th Annual Insect Fear Film Festival (2008) ===
The 25th IFFF, held on February 23, 2008, focused on "social insects" such as ants, bees, wasps, and termites. Social insects were highlighted for their remarkable behaviors, such as farming fungus, ranching aphids, and building towering termite mounds. The festival featured live displays of bee colonies, termite workers, and giant tropical ants, as well as screenings of the family-friendly films Bee Movie (2007) and Antz (1998). Simon J. Smith, the director of Bee Movie, was a special guest speaker this year.

=== 24th Annual Insect Fear Film Festival (2007) ===
The 24th IFFF, held on February 24, 2007, featured "Japanese insect-themed films" curated by entomologist May Berenbaum. Known for its unique relationship with insects, Japan views them through a cultural lens that is often less fear-driven than in the West. The festival showcased heroic insect characters like Mothra (1961), the giant silkworm, who defends humanity despite causing destruction due to her enormous size, comparable to that of a Boeing 747. Other films included The Ultimate Teacher (1988), featuring a half-human, half-cockroach character (茶羽顔八, X-8), and Blue Gender (2002), an anime about monstrous insect-like creatures. The event also featured exhibits, including a silkworm display in honor of Mothra.

=== 23rd Annual Insect Fear Film Festival (2006) ===
The 23rd IFFF, held on February 18, 2007, focused on "Mantis Movies." Despite Hollywood's exaggerations, such as the myth of sexual cannibalism, this year's festival aimed to correct misconceptions and showcase the true nature of these fascinating insects. Known for their predatory behavior and iconic "praying" posture, mantids have inspired both admiration and martial arts, including the creation of Tang Lang Ch'uan (Praying Mantis Kung Fu; 螳螂拳). The festival featured live mantid exhibits and a variety of films.

The festival featured several short films, including The Mantis Parable (2005), about a caterpillar and mantis; a Space Ghost Coast to Coast (1995) episode with Zorak, the alien mantis; and Mantis Stalks Its Prey (1995), a Chinese paper-cut animation about a mantid hunting its meal. In addition, the festival showcased The Deadly Mantis (1957), where a giant mantis is freed by nuclear testing and wreaks havoc in New York City, and "Teacher's Pet", an hour-long episode from the first season (1995) of Buffy the Vampire Slayer.

=== 22nd Annual Insect Fear Film Festival (2005) ===
The 22nd IFFF, held on February 19, 2025, focused on "forensic entomology"—the use of insects to solve crimes. While the practice has been recognized for over 700 years, it has only recently become a formal field. This year special featured activities such as a "maggot petting zoo" and "games to guess the post-mortem interval".

The festival's films included two cartoons featuring crime-solving insect superheroes: Creepy Crawlers (1985) and The Tick vs. Arthur (1994). It also showcased two feature films: Phenomena (1985), where Jennifer Connelly played a student who communicated with insects to help solve murders, and Flicks (1987), which featured a segment with Philip Alien, Space Detective, an alien cockroach solving crimes.

The festival culminated in the presentation of the IFFF's first "Image Award", given to William Petersen for his portrayal of forensic entomologist Gil Grissom on CSI. In CSI, Grissom uses maggots and other insect clues to solve murders, showcasing his deep knowledge of insects, which resonates with real-life entomologists. The festival organizers, EGSA at UIUC and the Entomology Department, also received a thank-you letter from Petersen for being honored with the award.

=== 21st Annual Insect Fear Film Festival (2004) ===
The 21st IFFF, held on February 28, 2004, focused on "genetically engineered insects." This year's theme traced the evolution of insect horror films, from radiation fears in the 1950s to insect mutations in the 1970s. With the rise of gene manipulation in the early 1980s, genetically modified insects became a new horror movie trope, reflecting public fears about the potential risks of emerging technologies.

The short films included Bus of the Undead (2001)from Aqua Teen Hunger Force and Insect Inside (1998) from The Powerpuff Girls. This year showcased three featured films: The Tuxedo (2002), in which Jackie Chan stars in a story where genetically engineered water striders grow to enormous size and threaten freshwater supplies. The film inaccurately suggests water striders have queens, which they do not. Mimic (1997), suggested by movie critic Roger Ebert, follows an entomologist who creates genetically modified "Judas Breed" cockroaches to combat a deadly disease, only for the bugs to evolve into human-like creatures that prey on people in New York City's subways. Despite the absurd use of litmus paper to identify the "Judas breed" of cockroaches, the film effectively highlights the dangers of genetic experimentation gone wrong. Tail Sting (2001), a cult film produced by University of Illinois alumni, features genetically altered scorpions escape during a flight and begin attacking passengers, turning an ordinary journey into a deadly ordeal.

=== 20th Annual Insect Fear Film Festival (2003) ===
The 20th Insect Fear Film Festival honored Bert I. Gordon, "Mr. BIG," a pioneer of the "big bug" genre, with a retrospective of his films featuring oversized creatures. With over 20 films, including at least ten focused on giant insects, Gordon was celebrated as the special guest for the festival's 20th anniversary and was presented with a plaque and certificate of appreciation for his lasting impact on the "big bug" genre.

Among the showcased films was Them! (1954), which depicted giant ants terrorizing Los Angeles and became Warner Brothers' biggest hit of the year. The festival also featured Beginning of the End (1957), set in Ludlow, Illinois, just 30 minutes north of UIUC, where giant grasshoppers cause destruction—though the crew never filmed in Ludlow, adding a fun trivia point. Another highlight was Earth vs. the Spider (1958), in which a giant spider, exposed to DDT, terrorizes a high school gymnasium. The film's depiction of cave-dwelling spiders was inspired by real species like the huntsman spider, though none are as large as the one on screen. Gordon's Empire of the Ants (1977), one of the few big bug films of the 1970s, followed a real estate developer selling land infested with giant, superintelligent ants and may have been the first to use the term “pheromone.”

=== 19th Annual Insect Fear Film Festival (2002) ===
The 19th annual Insect Fear Film Festival at the University of Illinois, held on February 9, 2002, centered on the theme "Alien Arthropods!" and explored the impact of non-native insects and arthropods invading the U.S. and causing economic damage. The festival featured three feature-length films and several short films, highlighting the concept of "alien" species. These included the 1970s sci-fi film Quatermass and the Pit (1967), the action-packed Starship Troopers (1997), and the horror film Spiders (2000). These films depicted humanity's struggle against insect-like extraterrestrials, tapping into public fears and misconceptions about arthropods.

=== 18th Annual Insect Fear Film Festival (2001) ===
The 18th IFFF, held on February 24, 2001, featured a focus on beetles. With over 250,000 species, beetles play crucial ecological roles, yet in films, they are often depicted as menacing, flesh-eating monsters. This year's screenings included beetle-related cartoons, short films, and three featured films: The Magic Voyage (1992), an animated adventure in which beetles accompany Christopher Columbus on his voyage; The Mummy (1999), a horror film featuring flesh-eating scarabs; and The Relic (1997), a science fiction thriller involving mutated, homicidal beetles.

=== 17th Annual Insect Fear Film Festival (2000) ===
The 17st IFFF, held on Feb. 26, 2000 focused on "bees", highlighting their ecological importance—pollinating a third of the food humans eat and producing honey, royal jelly, and propolis—while also exploring how they are often depicted as sinister in films, particularly low-budget horror movies. The festival featured two feature-length films: Terror Out of the Sky (1978), in which African killer bees invade New Orleans and target a busload of children, and Wax or the Discovery of Television Among the Bees (1991), a surreal cult film about a bee-keeping hobbyist whose mind is taken over by bees. Additionally, two sci-fi TV episodes were screened: ZZZZZ (1964), from The Outer Limits, where mutated, advanced bees create a female entomologist to mate with a researcher to destroy humanity, and Herrenfolk (1996), from The X-Files, which features an enormous bee colony supported by cloned children on a Canadian ginseng farm.

=== 16th Annual Insect Fear Film Festival (1999) ===
The 16th IFFF, held on 20 February 1999, focused on "Mosquitoes in the Movies" and featured a blood drive that allowed the Champaign County Community Blood Services to collect 21 pints of blood in one night.

The festival featured a variety of short films, including Winsor McCay's How a Mosquito Works (1912), Betty Boop's There’s Something About a Soldier and Walt Disney's The Winged Scourge (1943). It also screened an Army training film on malaria prevention and the U.S. Public Health classic It Must Be The Neighbors. The evening's films included Mosquito (1994), where giant mosquitoes terrorize a town after feeding on the blood of a dying alien, and Popcorn (1991), about college students who host a film festival and encounter disaster as well as Yellow Jack (1938). Dr. Berenbaum, the organizer, highlighted that while mosquitoes are major disease vectors, most films fail to portray this aspect. A rare exception was Yellow Jack (1938), which depicted Dr. Walter Reed's work linking mosquitoes to yellow fever.

=== 15th Annual Insect Fear Film Festival (1998) ===
The 15th Insect Fear Film Festival (IFFF), held in February 1998, focused on "Roaches Redux." Dr. Berenbaum, the organizer, remarked on the irony that, in 1997, Americans spent approximately $250 million on cockroach poisons, only to spend nearly the same amount watching movies about them.

Short films of this year included animated Raid commercials from the 1960s, Warner Brothers' Bingo Crosbyana, episodes of Santa Bugito, and the trailer for Twilight of the Cockroaches. Feature-length highlights included War of the Coprophages (1996), an X-Files episode where Agent Mulder teams up with entomologist Dr. Bambi Berenbaum to battle possible alien cockroaches; Joe’s Apartment (1996), a comedy about a young man befriending singing, dancing cockroaches in New York, with special effects by UIUC alumnus Chris Trimble; and Men in Black (1997), featuring a cockroach-like alien.

=== 14th Annual Insect Fear Film Festival (1997) ===
The 15th IFFF, held in February 1997, embraced an "all ants, all the time!" theme and marked the first year the festival was held in Foellinger Auditorium.

AN(T)imated shorts of this year included Dance of the Ants, Gay Anties, Ant Pasted, Ants in the Plants, One Less Ant, and Porky’s Ant. The feature films showcased Them! (1954), a sci-fi classic about giant radiation-mutated ants invading Los Angeles sewers, starring Edmund Gwenn; Phase IV (1974), a tale of super-ants challenging humanity for Earth's dominance, featuring Nigel Davenport and Lynne Frederick; and Angels and Insects (1995), a sensual drama exploring the Victorian social hierarchy through the lens of a myrmecologist.

=== 10th Annual Insect Fear Film Festival (1993) ===
The tenth IFFF, held in 1993, featured a 12-hour insect movie marathon and, for the first time, served food created using insects. This was also the first year that a children's insect art competition was held, with the winning drawings displayed for two weeks at the Natural History Museum.

=== 4th Annual Insect Fear Film Festival (1987) ===
The fourth IFFF, held in 1987, focused on "female" insect fear films. The lineup included Mothra, Empire of the Ants, and Invasion of the Bee Girls.

=== 1st Annual Insect Fear Film Festival (1984) ===
The first Insect Fear Film Festival was held in March 1984 and established a format that has endured over the years. The inaugural event showcased Them! (1954) and Bug(1975), interspersed with animated shorts, including the 1980 Academy Award-winning Hungarian short The Fly(1986).

Year	Session	Theme	Attendance	Location
2026	43rd	Insect-Human Hybrids	>700	Foellinger Auditorium
2025	42nd	Tarantulas: Hairy, Scary Spiders	>700	Foellinger Auditorium
2024	41st	Ant	Unknown	Foellinger Auditorium
2023	40th	Living Fossil Arthropod	Unknown	Foellinger Auditorium
2022	39th	Venom	Unknown	Online
2021	38th	Featuring Fleas	Unknown	Online
2020	37th	Crustacea	Unknown	Foellinger Auditorium
2019	36th	Termites	Unknown	Foellinger Auditorium
2018	35th	Ticks	Unknown	Foellinger Auditorium
2017	34th	Illini Alumnus Paul Hertzberg Insect Fear Films	Unknown	Foellinger Auditorium
2016	33rd	Exploding Arthropods	Unknown	Foellinger Auditorium
2015	32nd	Female Entomologists in Fear Films	Unknown	Foellinger Auditorium
2014	31st	Pesticides, particularly DDT	Unknown	Foellinger Auditorium
2013	30th	The Ins-X Files: The Truth (About Insects) Is Out There	>2,000	Foellinger Auditorium
2012	29th	International Ants	Unknown	Foellinger Auditorium
2011	28th	Killer Wasps	Unknown	Foellinger Auditorium
2010	27th	Prehistoric insects	Unknown	Foellinger Auditorium
2009	26th	Centipede Cinema	Unknown	Foellinger Auditorium
2008	25th	Social Insects	Unknown	Foellinger Auditorium
2007	24th	Japanese insect-themed films - Mothra	Unknown	Foellinger Auditorium
2006	23rd	Mantis Movies	Unknown	Foellinger Auditorium
2005	22nd	CSI - forensic entomology	Unknown	Foellinger Auditorium
2004	21st	Genetically engineered insects	Unknown	Foellinger Auditorium
2003	20th	Big Bug Tribute: Honoring Bert I. Gordon	Unknown	Foellinger Auditorium
2002	19th	Alien Arthropods!	Unknown	Foellinger Auditorium
2001	18th	beetles	Unknown	Foellinger Auditorium
2000	17th	Bee	Unknown	Foellinger Auditorium
1999	16th	Mosquitoes	Unknown	Foellinger Auditorium
1998	15th	Roaches Redux	Unknown	Foellinger Auditorium
1997	14th	All ants, all the time!	Unknown	Foellinger Auditorium
1996	13th	Non-insect apthropods	Unknown	Natural History Building
1995	12th	Parasites	Unknown	Natural History Building
1994	11th	Metamorphosis	Unknown	Natural History Building
1993	10th	12 hour insect film marathon	Unknown	Natural History Building
1992	9th	flies	Unknown	Natural History Building
1991	8th	cockroaches	Unknown	Natural History Building
1990	7th	social insects	Unknown	Natural History Building
1989	6th	orthopteroid	Unknown	Natural History Building
1988	5th	all-spider affair	Unknown	Natural History Building
1987	4th	"female" insect fear films	Unknown	Natural History Building
