= Ajayan Vincent =

Indian cinematographer

- Born: Chennai, Tamil Nadu, India
- Occupation: Cinematographer
- Relatives: A. Vincent (father); Jayanan Vincent (brother)

Ajayan Vincent is an Indian cinematographer. He is the son of cinematographer and director, A. Vincent, and younger brother to Jayanan Vincent. He is known for his work in Malayalam, Tamil, Telugu, and Hindi language films.

== Filmography ==
Year	Name	Language	Notes
1984	Shree Krishnaparanthu	Malayalam	
1987	Thoovanathumbikal	Malayalam	
1988	Paadatha Thenikkal	Tamil	
1989	Adharvam	Malayalam	
1990	Nari Nari Naduma Murari	Telugu	
1990	Jagadeka Veerudu Athiloka Sundari	Telugu	
1990	Pagalil Pournami	Tamil	
1992	Mallige Hoove	Kannada	
1993	Valli	Tamil	
1996	Sahasa Veerudu Sagara Kanya	Telugu	
1997	Annamayya	Telugu	
1997	Ratchagan	Tamil	
1998	Aavida Maa Aavide	Telugu	
1998	Chandralekha	Telugu	
1999	Yamajathakudu	Telugu	
1999	Rajakumarudu	Telugu	
1999	Ravoyi Chandamama	Telugu	
2000	Yuvaraju	Telugu	
2000	Vamsi	Telugu	
2002	16 December	Hindi	
2002	Kuch Tum Kaho Kuch Hum Kahein	Hindi	
2002	Chennakesava Reddy	Telugu	
2002	Beeper	English	
2003	3 Deewarein	Hindi	
2004	Anandamanandamaye	Telugu	
2004	Tapana	Telugu	
2004	Love	Kannada	
2004	19 Revolutions	English	
2004	Centipede!	English	
2004	Donga Dongadi	Telugu	
2005	Allari Pidugu	Telugu	
2007	Viyyalavari Kayyalu	Telugu	
2007	Ee Bandhana	Kannada	
2008	Mukhbiir	Hindi	
2009	Thanks Maa	Hindi	
2009	Bhramaram	Malayalam	
2009	Angel John	Malayalam	
2009	Olave Jeevana Lekkachara	Kannada	
2009	Male Barali Manju Irali	Kannada	
2010	Aagathan	Malayalam	
2010	Apoorvaragam	Malayalam	
2010	Best Actor	Malayalam	
2011	Arjunan Saakshi	Malayalam	
2011	Sevenes	Malayalam	
2011	Dam 999	English	
2011	Dakkanaga	English	
2012	Unnam	Malayalam	
2012	Face 2 Face	Malayalam	
2013	Sweety Nanna Jodi	Kannada	
2013	Om 3D	Telugu	
2014	The Last Supper	Malayalam	
2014	Mylanchi Monchulla Veedu	Malayalam	
2015	Rudhramadevi	Telugu	
2017	Overtake	Malayalam	
2018	Friends in Law	Hindi	
2018	Theetta Rappai	Malayalam	
2018	Mr and Mrs 420 Returns	Punjabi	
2019	The Gandhi Murder	English	
2019	Uda Aida	Punjabi	

== Awards ==
=== Tamil Nadu State Film Awards ===
- Best Cinematographer – Paadatha Thenikkal (1988)
