= Tim Cockerill =

British zoologist, broadcaster and photographer

Tim Cockerill FRES
- Education: University of Leeds (BSc, MRes) University of Cambridge (PhD) Imperial College London (MSc)
- Scientific career
- Workplaces: University of South Wales, Falmouth University

Tim Cockerill FRES is an zoologist, broadcaster and photographer in the UK, he is Senior Lecturer at Falmouth University and has a particular interest in Insects.

== Education and career ==
Cockerill grew in Hull in Yorkshire, he studied a Zoology BSc and MRes at the University of Leeds and then a PhD in Insect Ecology and Biodiversity at the University of Cambridge; he moved to the Natural History Museum to do postdoctoral research and then did a Masters in Science Media Production at Imperial College London. He was a Senior Lecturer at the University of South Wales where he taught natural history before moving to Falmouth University in 2018 where he teaches natural history photography.

== Broadcasting ==
Cockerill is a regular on BBC Radio Science programmes such as Science in Action, Inside Science and Crowd Science.

He was on the Natural Histories episode 'Fleas' with Brett Westwood in 2015 and the Infinite Monkey Cage episode 'Will insects inherit the earth' in 2017 with Brian Cox, Robin Ince and Amoret Whitaker. In 2014 he was on the BBC Four television programme Spider House.

In 2017 he presented a series of BBC World Service The Evidence episodes with Claudia Hammond about the relationships between humans and animals, this included a live event at the Wellcome Collection,

He contributed to the Guardian podcast episode 'Challenge of taxonomy and defining species' in 2018.

== Flea Circus ==
Cockerill has an interest in the history of flea circuses and he has spoken about them on radio and in videos. In 2010 he recreated a working flea circus for the 2010 Royal Institution Christmas Lectures and in 2021 he exhibited a flea circus at the virtual Insect Fear Film Festival.

== Honours and awards ==
Cockerill was awarded a Science Media Studentship from the Wellcome Trust in 2012–2014,

He was runner up in the British Ecological Society's photography competition in 2013 for his image of an oil palm plantation in Borneo. In 2014 his image of Wallace's beetle Cyriopalus wallacei won first prize in the Royal Entomological Society's National Insect Week photography competition category 'Small is Beautiful' and in 2020 he became chair of the judging panel, working with Ashleigh Whiffin.

Cockerill is a Fellow of the Royal Entomological Society and is a current Trustee of the society.
