= Mantis (comics) =

Comics name

Mantis, in comics, may refer to:

- Mantis (DC Comics), a supervillain in Jack Kirby's Fourth World
- Mantis (Marvel Comics), a former member of the Avengers and current member of the Guardians of the Galaxy.

== See also ==
- Mantis (disambiguation)
- M.A.N.T.I.S., a superhero from an eponymous television series
