= Flea circuses in popular culture =

Flea circuses in popular culture are represented in numerous cartoons, films, television shows, music, and novels. A flea circus is a sideshow in a fairground or circus that may involve real or artificial fleas as performers.

== Cartoons ==
- The Tex Avery cartoon The Flea Circus (MGM, 1954) features a French flea circus that disbands when the fleas see a dog and attack it; one flea, François (voiced by Bill Thompson, best known as the voice of Droopy), who played a sad flea clown, marries the star flea, Fifi, and they have enough offspring together to bring the flea circus back to life.
- Dixieland Droopy (1954), this Tex Avery-directed animated short in the Droopy series, features Droopy, as John Irving Pettybone, finding a "flea band" and being chased by a flea circus owner who wants the band for his circus. John Pettybone ultimately becomes the "dog of mystery," who supposedly "plays Dixieland without a band."
- Curtain Razor is a vintage Warner Bros. cartoon that has Porky Pig as a theatrical agent auditioning acts, including a shaggy dog, who turns out to be the transport of a flea circus, which proceeds to set itself up, perform, and return to the dog, on command.
- The Batfink episode "Jumping Jewelry" (1967) features Professor Hopper, an owner of a flea circus, using his trained fleas to steal jewelry.
- A Sesame Street animation spotlighting the letter "F" features a ringmaster presiding over a flea circus whose performers all begin with "F"; one ends up injuring his foot and another ends up destroying the whole circus trying to shoot himself from a cannon. Ringmaster: "Anybody wanna buy a used F?"
- A Season 26 (later rebroadcast as Season 28) episode of Sesame Street featured a flea circus at the Furry Arms Hotel, when the inhabitants have to the take care of the fleas; they accidentally let them loose, causing everyone in the hotel to get itched by the fleas.
- The Jetsons season 2 episode "Fugitive Fleas" (1985), a rock band of fleas take refuge on Astro to escape the tyrannical Solarini's flea circus.
- In the 1986 Cartoon, Foofur's season 2 episode, "What Price Fleadom", Fleadini's Flea Circus was stolen by the Rat Brothers to infest Hazel.
- Flea Circus (mid-1990s) is an autobiographical comic strip by Vic Pratt.
- Mona the Vampire features an episode in season one titled "Flea Circus of Horrors," which was broadcast in 2000.
- Grimmy's Flea Circus (2001) is a book in the Mother Goose and Grimm comic strip series.
- Haunted Mansion issue 4 (August 2006) "Night of the Ghost Fleas" features Fifi, the ghost dog, being plagued by ghost fleas who create a flea circus that ends up on his head.
- Ruby Gloom, a Canadian cartoon based on an apparel franchise that ran from 2006 to 2008, had two episodes featuring a flea circus show. In the first one, "Venus de Gloomsville", Skull Boy tries to train fleas for his own personal circus, but the constant yells of the Venus Flytrap from the house makes his training a mess. The second time this happens is in the episode "Pet Poepulation", where Skull Boy takes his circus to a pet talent contest, where they participate, although they lose the prize, because the fleas were not even seen in the crowd due to their size.
- The Muppet Show: The Treasure of Peg-Leg Wilson issue 3 (2009) features fleas who put on the act, Julius Prunes Amazing Flea Circus, on Animal's drums.
- The Adventures of Jimmy Neutron: Boy Genius episode "Jimmy Goes to College", features Hugh Neutron owning a flea circus.
- The Hey Duggee episode "The Circus Badge", focuses on a flea circus.
- The SpongeBob SquarePants episode "Under the Small Top", involves a flea circus ravaging Squidward's house.

== Films ==
- Thundering Fleas (1926) An Our Gang film featuring Oliver Hardy and a cameo appearance by comedian Charley Chase.
- The Chimp (1932), this Laurel and Hardy short film features a flea circus given as a pay-off, which escapes into the bed, causing everyone to itch
- It's in the Bag! (1945), Fred Allen is a flea circus ringmaster
- Limelight (1952), Charlie Chaplin performing a flea circus
- Mr. Arkadin (1955), Mischa Auer plays a flea circus owner (with real fleas) in this Orson Welles film.
- Jurassic Park (1993) creator John Hammond explains how he used to exhibit a flealess mechanical flea circus when he was first starting out in entertainment.
- The City of Lost Children (1995) features a former circus/freak show owner, Marcello, who uses performing fleas carrying poison to assassinate people.
- A Bug's Life (1998), the Disney/Pixar animated film, centers on a troupe of flea circus performers, including their owner, P.T. Flea, a parody of the real-life circus entrepreneur P.T. Barnum
- The Death of the Flea Circus Director by Thomas Koerfer, a dark tale of a performer who switches from a flea circus to a play about the plague
- Bone Tomahawk (2015) includes a discussion about flea circuses

== Music ==
- Taylor Street Flea Circus, indie rock band based in Portland, Oregon
- "Flea Circus", country song on the album Don’t You Go Chicken (1960s) by Ramblin' Tommy Scott
- "Flea Circus", grunge song on the album Step on a Bug (1988) by The U-Men
- "Flea Circus", modern creative song on the album Papa Woody (1996) by Ether Bunny
- "Flea Circus", anti-folk song on the album X-Ray Vision (1996) by The Moldy Peaches
- "Flea Circus", folk music song on the album Circle (2006) by Uiscedwr
- "Flea Circus", song by Marder in the film FAQ About Time Travel (2009)
- "Fifi The Flea", pop/folk song on the album Would You Believe (1966) by The Hollies

== Other ==
- Master Flea, an 1822 novel by E. T. A. Hoffmann features a villain who uses his control over the titular character in order to create an elaborate flea circus.
- The Flea Circus (Novella, 1950s) by Billy Lee Brammer
- Esmeralda (1954), a short story by John Wyndham, is centered around a flea circus.
- David Attenborough's Natural Curiosities (2015) features Svensons real flea circus.
- A flea circus is featured in Enid Blyton's novel The Mystery of the Missing Man (1956)
- The Flea Circus (Islet Books, 1989) by poet Alan Pizzarelli
- Mighty Morphin Power Rangers season one episode "For Whom the Bell Trolls" (1993), reveals Bulk and Skull's hobbies include picking up fleas from stray dogs. They attempted to demonstrate their flea circus in their class' hobby week, but the fleas escape onto their teacher Miss Appleby
- Round the Twist episode "Dog By Night" (2000), at a flea circus, a rare Transylvanian flea named Count Dracumite sinks its teeth into Pete, turning him into a werewolf at night
- Flea Circus, a bi-monthly event in Angel, London featuring comedy, music and poetry.
- Maxfield Rubbish and His Time Travelling Flea Circus, presented at the Hitchcock Puppet Theater in Balboa Park, San Diego, California
- "Flea Circus" (2006), Hewlett-Packard commercial produced by Bent Image Lab
- In the fourth episode of Touch Detective, the main character Mackenzie investigates a "murder" case which took place in a flea circus.
- Flea Circus, a puzzle game on the FunOrb website, originally developed by Andrew Gower
- Acme Miniature Flea Circus was featured on the television show Jeopardy! in 2001.
- In the game Psychonauts 2, the mental construct Ford Cruller built in Lucrecia Mux's mind takes the form of a flea circus.
- A flea circus is one of the acts Putt-Putt must help in the video game Putt-Putt Joins the Circus.
- A flea circus travelling via caravan can be encountered and helped by guiding found fleas to it in the game Hollow Knight: Silksong.
- In Season 2 Episode 3 of Interview with the Vampire (TV series) a flea circus is featured.
