= The Best of John Wyndham =

Collection of John Wyndham Stories

- First edition
- Author: John Wyndham
- Cover artist: Patrick Woodroffe
- Language: English
- Genre: Science fiction, horror
- Publisher: Sphere Books
- Publication date: 1973
- Media type: Print (hardback & paperback)
- ISBN: 0-7221-9369-6

The Best of John Wyndham is a paperback collection of science fiction stories (six short stories and six novelettes) by John Wyndham, published after his death by Sphere Books, first in 1973. Michael Joseph Limited has published the book as a hardcover under the title The Man from Beyond and Other Stories in 1975. For the 1977 Sphere paperback edition it was split into two parts, both containing the full bibliography and the introduction by Leslie Flood.

== Contents ==
- The Best of John Wyndham 1932-1949 (ISBN 0-7221-9373-4)
  - "The Lost Machine" (1932), novelette
  - "The Man from Beyond" (1934), novelette, variant of "The Man from Earth"
  - "The Perfect Creature" (1937), novelette
  - "The Trojan Beam" (1939), novelette
  - "Vengeance by Proxy" (1940), as by John Beynon
  - "Adaptation" (1949)
- The Best of John Wyndham 1951-1960 (ISBN 0-7221-9374-2)
  - "Pawley's Peepholes" (1951)
  - "The Red Stuff" (1951), novelette
  - "And the Walls Came Tumbling Down" (1951)
  - "Dumb Martian" (1952), novelette
  - "Close Behind Him" (1953)
  - "The Emptiness of Space" (1960), variant of "The Asteroids, 2194"

== Plots ==
- "The Lost Machine" is the posthumous history of an artificial intelligence's experiences on the barbaric planet Earth in the primitive times of the early 20th Century. This story is directly related to Wyndham's 1936 novel, Planet Plane, in which some of the elements of this story are outlined by the character, Joan.
- "The Man From Beyond" sees a human desperately attempting to convince the people of Venus to have nothing to do with their neighbours in space as they are without hope of redemption.
- "The Perfect Creature" has also been published as "Una" in Jizzle and tells the story of a scientist's attempts to create the 'perfect' creature, and what happens when he gets the hormone balance wrong.
- "The Trojan Beam" sees a British secret agent used as a go-between with the warring states of China and Japan and sees the Trojan Beam used to alter the balance of power.
- "Vengeance by Proxy" is a horror story updating the vampire myth to modern Eastern Europe and pastiching the story telling form of Bram Stoker's Dracula.
- Adaption dramatises the need for life to be adapted to the world in which it grows on as a father searches desperately for his long lost daughter.
- "Pawley's Peepholes" sees time travelers from the future disrupting small-town life by treating it as a quaint place to sight see.
- "The Red Stuff" is a mysterious, fast growing entity that first consumes a meteorite, then an entire space ship and ends up on a Moon base.
- "And the Walls Came Tumbling Down" is the report of a silicone based life form experiencing hostility on Earth.
- "Dumb Martian" tells of a Human and his Martian 'wife' out deep in space, far away from civilisation and the man's slow descent into brutality and madness.
- "Close Behind Him" is a horror story about a burglar who becomes convinced that the spirit of a man killed during a break in is coming ever closer behind him.
- "The Emptiness of Space" is a story of the Troon family as seen in The Outward Urge. In New Caledonia, 2194, an astronaut suffers the after effects of the urge to travel in space and fears he has lost his soul.
