= Paadatha Theneekkal =

- Poster
- Directed by: V. M. C. Haneefa
- Screenplay by: M. Karunanidhi
- Produced by: Murasoli Selvam
- Starring: Sivakumar; Radhika
- Cinematography: Ajayan Vincent
- Edited by: Venkateswara Rao
- Music by: Ilaiyaraaja
- Production company: Poompuhar Productions
- Release date: 8 November 1988
- Country: India
- Language: Tamil

Paadatha Theneekkal (transl. The bees that do not sing) is a 1988 Indian Tamil-language film, directed by V. M. C. Haneefa, starring Sivakumar and Radhika. It is a remake of the Malayalam film Sandarbham. The film was released on 8 November 1988.

== Cast ==
- Sivakumar
- Radhika
- Sripriya
- Chandrasekhar
- Manorama
- S. S. Chandran
- Ravichandran
- Sujitha

== Soundtrack ==
Music was composed by Ilaiyaraaja.

Song	Singers	Lyrics
"Aathi Antham"	Ilaiyaraaja, Krishnamoorthy, S. S. Chandran, P. Susheela, Manorama	Ilaiyaraaja
"Darr Darr Doctor"	S. P. Balasubrahmanyam	Vaali
"Vaadagai Veedithu"	Vani Jairam, Mano	Vaali
"Vanna Nilave"	K. J. Yesudas	Vaali
"Vanna Nilave"	K. S. Chithra	Vaali

== Reception ==
The Indian Express wrote "its again a melodrama, without the sentiment not being laid too thick". Jayamanmadhan of Kalki appreciated the screenplay for being clear and not confusing.
