= Touch Detective 3 =

Touch Detective Rising 3: Does Funghi Dream Of Bananas?
- Developer: BeeWorks
- Publishers: Success Corporation; Nicalis
- Platforms: Nintendo 3DS; Nintendo Switch
- Release: Nintendo 3DS: JP: May 1, 2014; Nintendo Switch: JP: October 6, 2022; WW: March 28, 2024
- Genre: Adventure
- Mode: Single-player

Touch Detective Rising 3: Does Funghi Dream of Bananas? (Japanese: おさわり探偵 小沢里奈 ライジング3 ~なめこはバナナの夢を見るか?~, Hepburn: Osawari Tantei Ozawa Rina Raijingu 3 ~Nameko wa Banana no Yume o Miru ka?~), released officially in western regions as Touch Detective 3, is a point-and-click mystery adventure game for the Nintendo 3DS which makes use of the device's touch screen. It was developed by BeeWorks and released in Japan by Success Corporation. It is the third title in the Touch Detective (Osawari Tantei: Ozawa Rina) series, after Touch Detective and Touch Detective 2 ½. The game features Mackenzie returning to the main character role as she faces a new detective rival, and once again takes her arch-rival, the Cornstalker.

It was released for Nintendo Switch in Japan as part of a compilation game titled Touch Detective: Rina and the Funghi Case Files in October 2022, and worldwide in March 2024, titled Touch Detective 3 + The Complete Case Files. This marked Touch Detective 3's first official release outside of Japan.

== Gameplay ==
The gameplay remains true to the previous games, with the player controlling main character Detective Mackenzie by way of the touch screen. The touch screen will be used for collecting items and evidence, as well as being used to interact with people. Players can presents items they have to people, by selecting the item from their inventory and using it on that person. The gamescreen as well as graphical look remains as it was in previous games.

The game features a new reward system, in which the player is rewarded with coins for completing set objectives, which are used to unlock extra content.

== Characters ==
Rina Ozawa (小沢 里奈, Ozawa Rina) / Mackenzie
Mackenzie returns as the lead character. As a young girl, she runs a detective agency with the help of her family butler, Cromwell.
Nameko (なめこ) / Funghi
A living nameko mushroom that is kept as a pet by Mackenzie and travels with her as she moves about town.
Shiro Tachi (館 史郎, Tachi Shiro) / Norman Touche
A boy from a plutocratic background who challenges Mackenzie in a contest to become the greatest detective in the world. He actually has a child like personality deep down, which he tries to hide.
Kinako (きなこ) / Pudding
A "professional assistant" dispatched from the Great Detective Society to act as Norman's partner, she has the appearance of a shaggy yellow dog.
Manami (まなみ) / Penelope
One of the girls that lives in the condominiums in town, and Mackenzie's best friend, she is known for being extremely weird and is constantly getting herself into trouble.
Chitose (ちとせ) / Chloe
Another girl in town, and while friend of Mackenzie, tends to be her rival in trying to solve cases. Chloe generally takes actions before figuring out their consequences.
Jii (じい, Jii) / Cromwell
Butler for Mackenzie and also a genius inventor, Cromwell is a man who has worked for Mackenzie's family for over 300 years.
Daisy (デイジー, Deijī)
A girl who works part-time at the local clothing boutique "Naked Bones".
Phantom Thief Morokoshi (怪盗モロコシ, Kaitō Morokoshi) / The Cornstalker
The villain of Touch Detective 2 ½, a master of disguise and thief of antiquities, his identity is actually Conner, the local antique dealer, a fact that is often made obvious to the player, despite the characters being oblivious to it. He is working alongside a mad scientist called Scientist M.A.A.D.
Police Inspector Daria (ダリア警部, Daria Keibu) / Inspector Daria
A police officer and self-proclaimed rival of the Cornstalker, she is now much more friendly towards Mackenzie and openly considers her to be a highly smart detective. Although she still also harbors an open jealously over the Cornstalker considering Mackenzie as his rival, she is freely willing to work with Mackenzie on cases related to the Cornstalker.

Other characters from previous games, including Beatrice the landlady, the planetarium owner from Touch Detective, and Connor from Touch Detective 2 ½, also return in this game. New to this game is M.A.A.D, an evil scientist who is working with the Cornstalker, and his good-natured twin brother, who is doctor known to locals as "Schrodinger's Doctor".

== Plot ==
=== Episode 1 ===
The famous detective Norman Touche, who aims to be the world's number one detective, is in town and comes to Mackenzie to challenge her. Penelope turns up during their meeting and claims that her bananas have been stolen, and Norman declares that the one to solve the case first will win their challenge. Mackenzie investigates and discovers that there are no bananas left in the town, but gets a lead that the culprit might be hiding deep in the forest. Norman's pet, Pudding, collapses, unbeknown to Norman. Mackenzie hunts down a doctor, who tells Mackenzie that Pudding has a cold, something which is potentially fatal for an animal like her. Mackenzie tries telling Norman about Pudding's condition, but he doesn't pay it any mind until he is told that could kill her. Norman entrusts the case's resolution to Mackenzie to be by Pudding's side. Mackenzie and Inspector Daria discover the Cornstalker's hideout in the forest, where he is planning to use the stolen bananas to make a sentient "Banana Man". He is being aided by a scientist, who is the brother of the doctor. Mackenzie is able swap some of the bananas with spoiled ones, which causes Banana Man to be born improperly, thus stopping the Cornstalker's plot.

=== Episode 2 ===
Mackenzie receives a request letter request supposedly from gnomes, asking her to save their town from being destroyed by a giant "Mecha Funghi". As she asks around, she discovers that there have been sightings among townsfolk of garbage moving by itself. The trail eventually leads to gnomes who are living near the garbage dump in the forest. The gnome chief displays a deep prejudice for humans, who explains that gnomes have been taught for generations that humans are horrific creatures. After proving herself by finding the keys that allows access to the village, Mackenzie is informed that the gnomes have been taking garbage to use as a barricade whenever Mecha Funghi attacks. Mackenzie, Penelope, and Chloe, help build barricade for the gnomes, only to discover that Mecha Funghi is very small and non-threatening by human perspective. Chloe "defeats" it by kicking it. Having been saved by humans, the gnomes open up to their company, and Mackenzie contemplates on still not knowing what "Mecha Funghi" actually was.

Post-episode content reveals that Mecha Funghi was actually an alarm clock that Norman illegally dumped, which awakens someone by flashing a laser-esque flashlight.

=== Episode 3 ===
Cromwell becomes so distressed by a string of invention failures that he forcefully requests Mackenzie to fire him and find a replacement. Meanwhile, Mayor Tom is holding a "car eraser" competition, in which participants compete to push erasers modelled into cars the furthest with a pen. Cromwell invents a modified car eraser as his "final invention", but Mackenzie's record time is trumped by the former prime minister when he arrives. After some tips from the prime minister, Cromwell updates the car eraser, but Mackenzie's new record is beaten with a seemingly impossible record of 10 meters by the mad scientist who is working for the Cornstalker. Suspecting something suspicious, Mackenzie discovers that the Cornstalker is attempting to get the competition prize, an OOPArt crystal, to create a perpetual motion machine. A new determined Cromwell modifies the car again (this time not following the official regulations); Mackenzie sets a record of thousands of meters, and is awarded the crystal. Cromwell is revealed to be the former PM's old master inventor. Mackenzie gives the crystal to the PM for safe keeping, and a newly reinvigorated Cromwell stays as Mackenzie's butler.

=== Episode 4 ===
Chloe is concerned that Penelope has been acting "weirdly normal" lately. Mackenzie finds out that Penelope is studying hard at a cram school to become a "respectable adult". Concerned that she is acting so out of character, Mackenzie investigates the prep school. While she witnesses Penelope at prep school, Chloe and Cromwell also meet Penelope at the office. The three eventually conclude there must be two Penelopes. Mackenzie tricks the Penelope they know to be real into wearing a bell on her left wrist, so they can tell her apart from the fake Penelope. Her and Chloe track the prep school teacher to a park, where they learn that the teacher is being aided by the mad scientist. They are attempting to use a sun ritual which make the real Penelope vanish, replaced by the fake "studious". Cromwell invents a special elemental cloud generator which can block the anti-quantum ray. Mackenzie uses it, and interrupts the ritual. At the school, the real Penelope comes face to face with her fake. The scientist and teacher explains that the "fake Penelope" was born out of the "real Penelope" and her repressed, subconscious desire to be a respectable student. Despite the insistence that this side of herself is real and what Penelope actually wants, Mackenzie and Chloe tell them that "their Penelope" is the only Penelope they love. The "real Penelope" chases the "fake Penelope" until she is able to touch her, causing the two of them to merge back into the one true Penelope.

=== Episode 5 ===
During the run-up to the annual "Star Festival", all the towns people have fallen into a sleep like trance. For some reason, Mackenzie and Daria are the only people unaffected. As they investigate the townspeople, they find one other person, the sweet shop Granny, who is also unaffected, although the pair are unable to understand what links the three of them together. Mackenzie receives a warning letter from the Cornstalker, warning that he will steal the townsfolks "hopes and dreams". The Cornstalker appears and mentions an enormous source of energy. Mackenzie goes to the former PM's mansion, believing the Cornstalker's words to be in reference to the OOPArt crystal, but the Cornstalker manages to make off with it. Mackenzie and Daria eventually deduce that the only people who are not affected by the trance are those who haven't written a wish paper for the Star Festival, and conclude that the Cornstalker's plan is to steal the hopes and dreams of the townsfolk via their tanzaku. Mackenzie and Daria track the Cornstalker and the evil scientist to the top of the town's giant bamboo tree, where they are trying to use the crystal's energy in a plan to steal the hopes and dreams of everyone in the world. The scientist reveals that his motivation comes from his past as a doctor, akin to his brother. Seeing so much suffering made him believe that hope and ambition causes despair, and thus, that hope and ambition shouldn't exist. Mackenzie stops their plan by destroying the crystal. Its explosion sends Mackenzie falling from the tree, but she is saved by Norman, who hadn't gotten his hope stolen either, since he never wrote a tanzaku, not being a resident of the town. Everyone recovers their wishes, and the townsfolk return to normal, and the scientist supposedly reforms.

Post-episode, Mackenzie attempts to learn the Cornstalker's identity, however the scientist purposefully misleads her on behalf of the Cornstalker, indicating that he has likely not truly reformed, and ending things on the status quo.
