= Mantis (disambiguation) =

Mantis is the common name of any insect in the order Mantodea, also commonly known as praying mantises.

Mantis may also refer to:

== Science and technology ==
=== Biology ===
- Mantis (genus), a genus of mantises
- Mantis shrimp, also known as stomatopods, predatory crustaceans
- Mantispidae or mantis-flies, small predatory insects whose front legs are similar to those of a praying mantis

=== Computing ===
- MANTIS, a programming language or an application generator marketed by Cincom
- Mantis Bug Tracker, a bug tracking system

=== Spacecraft ===
- MANTIS (spacecraft), "Main-belt Asteroid and NEO Tour with Imaging and Spectroscopy", a proposed NASA spacecraft that would flyby multiple asteroids
- MANTIS (space telescope), "Monitoring Activity from Nearby Stars with UV Imaging and Spectroscopy", a planned NASA space telescope

== Arts and entertainment ==
- Mantis (album), a 2009 studio album by progressive rock/jam band Umphrey's McGee
- The Mantis, a 2023 novel in the Hitman franchise by Kōtarō Isaka

=== Comics ===
- Mantis (DC Comics), a supervillain in Jack Kirby's Fourth World
- Mantis (Marvel Comics), a member of The Avengers
  - Mantis (Marvel Cinematic Universe), the Marvel Cinematic Universe version of the character

=== Games ===
- Mantis, also known as Stinger Mantis, a ship in the video game Star Wars Jedi: Fallen Order
- Psycho Mantis, a boss in the video game Metal Gear Solid
- Mantis, an alien insect-like race in the real-time strategy computer game Conquest: Frontier Wars
- Mantis, an alien race in the MMORPG Pirate Galaxy
- XF5700 Mantis, a space sim by MicroPlay in 1992
- The Mantis, an alien insect-like race in the roguelike computer game FTL: Faster Than Light

=== Film and television ===
- M.A.N.T.I.S., a superhero television series
- La Mante, a 2017 French miniseries
  - Queen Mantis, a 2025 South Korean adaptation
- Mantis (film), a 2025 South Korean Netflix film

== Military ==
- BAE Systems Mantis, an unmanned air vehicle developed by BAE Systems
- MANTIS Air Defence System, a very short-range air defence system of the German Army intended for base-protection

== Other uses ==
- Jeremy Coney, former New Zealand cricket captain's nicknamed "The Mantis"
- Cagn, a god of the San of southern Africa, who often takes the shape of a praying mantis
- Mantis (roller coaster), a former stand-up roller coaster at Cedar Point
- Marcos Mantis, a British sports car
- Mantis, the ancient Greek word for seer or soothsayer, one cognizant of the will of divinity learned through divination

== See also ==
- UltraMantis Black, a professional wrestler, who performs primarily in the Chikara professional wrestling promotion
- Northern Praying Mantis, a martial art
- Southern Praying Mantis, a martial art
- Praying mantis (disambiguation)
- Mantissa (disambiguation)
- Manta (disambiguation)
