= Touch Detective 2 ½ =

2007 video game

- Developer: BeeWorks
- Publishers: JP: Success Corporation; NA: Atlus USA; EU: 505 Games; WW: BeeWorks (iOS, Android)
- Directors: Takahiro Anto; Shingo Kawai
- Producers: Iberia Iberiko; Takashi Isoyama
- Programmer: Takuji Imai
- Writers: Kingo Hirako; Fujiko Shibuya
- Composer: Hijirido
- Platforms: Nintendo DS, iOS, Android, Nintendo Switch
- Release: Nintendo DS: JP: May 24, 2007; NA: October 9, 2007; EU: April 18, 2008; iOS: WW: March 22, 2012; Android: WW: June 26, 2013; Nintendo Switch: JP: October 6, 2022; WW: March 28, 2024
- Genre: Adventure
- Mode: Single-player

Touch Detective 2 ½ ^{JPN} ^{EUR} is an adventure game for the Nintendo DS, iOS, and Android. It is a sequel to the Nintendo DS game, Touch Detective that is centered around the titular character, Mackenzie. It features 5 chapters that each have a case to be solved. Like its predecessor, this game is a point-and-click game that utilizes the device's touch screen. Its release sparked the development of many Funghi based spin-off games for mobile devices. The game was released in Japan for Nintendo Switch as part of a compilation video game titled Touch Detective: Rina and the Funghi Case Files in October 2022 and worldwide in March 2024.

== Gameplay ==
Players take control of Mackenzie, the Touch Detective. The game, for the most part, is played out on the Nintendo DS touch screen, though at times, Mackenzie's inner monologue will be displayed on the top screen.

Clicking around an area will move Mackenzie. Players can also click on the townspeople to talk to them, or on items to pick them up. Players can use items they've collected to solve puzzles or gather valuable information from the townspeople.

== Characters ==
- Mackenzie is the main character of this game. She is recently accepted into The Great Detective's Society but she does not like her title, Touch Detective.
- Funghi is Mackenzie's faithful pet mushroom and companion. He also comes in handy when secret documents need to be destroyed. He always follows Mackenzie around town.
- Cromwell is Mackenzie's butler, and a genius inventor. After Mackenzie was accepted into The Great Detective's Society, he decides to train her manners, although some of it annoys her.
- Penelope is one of Mackenzie's best friends. Penelope enjoys having a lavish lifestyle since she comes from a rich family, but is rather an air-head. Most of Mackenzie's cases come from her since she always seems to be in trouble.
- Chloe is Mackenzie's rival and she calls herself 'Chloe the Super Sleuth'. She is always trying to beat Mackenzie when it comes to solving the case. She always appears out of nowhere around Mackenzie's office when a client asks Mackenzie for help solving a case. There is a recurring gag that whenever she has a great idea, Mackenzie will always leave and she will confront her into giving her ideas since they are friends.
- Inspector Daria is a red-headed inspector who has no patience for Mackenzie. She tries to solve cases before Mack can when The Cornstalker is involved. She is the self-proclaimed rival of The Cornstalker. She often throws out her back while making her extravagant entrance poses. She gets motion sickness when traveling.
- The Cornstalker is a professional thief and master of disguise, he tries to steal the rarest and most valuable items in the world. He always calls Mackenzie "Touch Detective", though no one knows how he knows about it.
- Ace and Friday: A mysterious young man with a grudge against the rail conductor, and his rodent associate "Friday the Freeloader".
- Mayor Tom is mildly corrupt mayor, and he always panics or faints if anything happens to his items.
- Eric is a petty, smooth talking salesman who cheats on his clients to make a profit for himself.
- Harrison is a tough, hairy archaeologist who seeks to find rare artifacts, fossils and relics and make a name for himself.
- Colleen is the mysterious young curator who runs the haunted mansion although it actually holds a dark secret of her and the mansion itself.
- Silver is a living puppet that sleeps for many years. He could sing beautifully until a freak accident makes him lose his voice.
- Connor is a young man who has recently moved to the town and opened an antique shop. He often gives Mackenzie information on antiques, and sometimes gives her useful items. His shop seems to be closed quite often. Mackenzie thinks he is rather cute, perhaps having a mild crush on him. It is a running gag that he is obviously the Cornstalker, despite Mackenzie's obviousness to the fact.

Screenshot from Touch Detective 2 ½

== Cases ==
Episode 1 - Robbery, the salvation of an ancient relic
Penelope comes to Mackenzie's office because her colored noodles have been stolen, leaving her with only white noodles. Mackenzie starts the investigation only to find out that no one in town has any colored noodles anymore. She later finds out that a page was torn out from Mayor Tom's Top Secret Picture Book. She manages to find the missing page with Yvonne, and tells Mayor Tom about it, but whenever he confronts Yvonne, he tends to forget about it. Then, Mackenzie finds a heart-shaped fossil that was dropped by the mayor and after further investigation, she finds out that someone is trying to destroy the town to retrieve a hidden treasure. They plan to do this by recreating the legend of the White Falcons wherein something white is needed. Mackenzie suspects the mayor who then reveals himself as The Cornstalker in disguise. Mackenzie foils The Cornstalker's plans, but he still manages to escape.

Episode 2 - Deception, a noble fight against injustice
Mackenzie is rewarded with a train ticket by Mayor Tom. Meanwhile, a robbery occurs. It turns out to be the Cornstalker who stole the relic of the Seabottom Dwellers in one of Eric's suitcases. Inspector Daria investigates but she isn't any help due to her motion sickness. Mackenzie finds the Cornstalker disguised as an old lady with the stolen suitcase is in "her" luggage, but he again manages to escape. It was later revealed that Eric is the real culprit, framing the Cornstalker but he comes back to steal the suitcases containing the actual relic. Mackenzie gives chase and recovers the relic with some help from the train conductor, but The Cornstalker escapes again.

Episode 3 - Deliverance, the curse of cumulative destinies
Harrison discovered an amber gem and a human fossil in the pyramid. Meanwhile, Mackenzie is on a field trip to the museum when someone vandalizes a statue. Mackenzie decides to investigate and becomes Harrison's assistant. They move the human fossil into Mayor Tom's museum only to discover that it is actually the cursed Fossil Hunter. The next day, Mackenzie receives a letter from the Cornstalker who plans to steal the amber gem. Harrison is about to hold a press conference when Inspector Daria arrives to guard the museum. She makes everyone leave to prevent the Cornstalker from entering the museum but Mackenzie manages to come inside and sees an alien. After that commotion, Harrison asks her where the amber gem is, but she lies and replaces it with a fake one. Suddenly, another Harrison arrives, exposing the first one as the Cornstalker who quickly steals the fake amber. Mackenzie puts the real amber back into the Fossil Hunter's eye socket bringing him back to life. He explains that he comes from another dimension and is only able to live in their dimension thanks to his eye. His eye came out after a premonition regarding the events of the Noodle Festival, which caused him to turn into a fossil. It is revealed that the "alien" is actually part of the ancient Seabottom Dweller race.

Episode 4 - Recollection, an illusion hidden in the melody
Penelope rushes into Mackenzie's office to tell her that she has seen a corpse inside the Haunted Mansion's greenhouse. When both of them return there, they realize that he is not actually a corpse and assume that he is sleeping. They try to wake him up but fails, so Mackenzie touches the body and discovers that it's only a doll. She also finds a hole in it and uses the wind-up key that she found inside the mansion. The doll wakes up and introduces himself as Silver. He says he doesn't know why he can talk and thinks he has a problem as cannot sing anymore. He mentions a girl who always listened to his songs but when she moved closer to the window, there was a flash and he never saw her again nor can he sing anymore. Mackenzie decides to help Silver and find the girl. She makes her own ghost detector and find a ghost named Colleen. She figures out that Colleen is the same mysterious girl that Silver mentions so she tells her about him, but Colleen gets scared and runs away. Mackenzie goes back to the greenhouse and asks Silver to sing again to guide Colleen to him. The Cornstalker appears, planning to steal Silver but decides not since his singing is bad. Silver feels very sad about this insult. Mackenzie finds Colleen outside the greenhouse. She convinces her to apologize to him and she does. Silver sings again but suddenly, Spooky the cat scares Colleen. She goes through the window with a big flash and disappears. Surprisingly, Silver can sing normally again. As she leaves the building, Mackenzie realizes that Colleen is still there beside Silver through the silver window.

Episode 5 - Invasion, a vendetta of afar
Chloe and Penelope tells Mackenzie that they found a raffle voucher for some Mongolian beef. The three of them decide to search for more tickets. While doing so, Mackenzie finally receives her ID card from The Great Detective's Society. After collecting all five raffles, Mackenzie is also given a VIP pass to the exhibition and invites Cromwell. An artifact is stolen by the Cornstalker, so Mackenzie and her friends track him down inside a pink elephant structure. He tries to escape, but a spaceship appears and takes the whole room along with everyone inside. Mackenzie then wakes up to find herself alone. She soon discovers that the Seabottom Dwellers are actually the servants of aliens who plan to vaporize all of the cows on Earth. After Mackenzie frees everyone, she plants Cromwell's time bomb. They escape and foil the aliens' plans. In the end, they go home and are welcomed by the Men in Black.

== Reception ==
Reception

Aggregate score
Aggregator	Score
Metacritic	67/100

Review scores
Publication	Score
Adventure Gamers	3/5
Eurogamer	7/10
Famitsu	29/40
GamePro	4/5
GameSpot	5.5/10
GameZone	7/10
IGN	6.8/10
Nintendo Power	6.5/10
RPGFan	84/100

The DS version received "average" reviews according to the review aggregation website Metacritic. In Japan, Famitsu gave it a score of 29 out of 40.

== Legacy ==
After this game, a lot of Funghi based spin-off games were released for iOS and Android, and a spin-off puzzle game titled Osawari Tantei Nameko Daihanshoku was released for Nintendo 3DS in 2013.

A sequel to Touch Detective 2 ½, Touch Detective Rising 3: Does Funghi Dream Of Bananas?, was released in Japan in May 2014 for Nintendo 3DS.

== Notes ==
Known in Japan as Touch Detective: Ozawa Rina - Season 2 1/2: Rina saw! No, I have not seen it. (おさわり探偵 小沢里奈 シーズン2 1/2 里奈は見た!いや、見てない。, Osawari Tantei: Ozawa Rina - Shīzun 2 1/2: Rina ha Mita! Iya, Mite nai.)

Known in Europe as Mystery Detective II.
