= Ashleigh Whiffin =

British entomologist

- Education: University of Derby (BSc); Harper Adams University (MSc)
- Scientific career
- Fields: Entomology
- Workplaces: Edinburgh University; National Museum of Scotland

Ashleigh Whiffin is an entomologist in the UK. She is a curator at the National Museum of Scotland and a specialist in carrion beetles (Silphidae).

== Education and career ==
Whiffin studied BSc (Hons) in forensic science at the University of Derby, during which she specialised in forensic entomology. She moved on to do MSc Entomology at Harper Adams University, and then started as a research technician at the University of Edinburgh working on burying beetles in Jacob Moorad's lab.

In 2014 she joined National Museums Scotland (NMS) as a Collections Assistant, progressed as Curatorial Assistant 2015 and Assistant Curator of Entomology 2016, then took up the position as Pelham-Clinton Entomology Genetic Collection Curator 2022–2024, after which she became Curator of Entomology.

== Research ==
Whiffin has carried out forensic entomology research, as well as work on the insects attracted to plants with carrion flowers, such as the carrion beetle Necrodes littoralis which as attracted to the Titan arum 'New Reekie' at Royal Botanic Garden Edinburgh, the first time that carrion beetles have been recorded attracted to the plant species outside of Indonesia'.

She has worked on Ichneumonid wasps within the NMS collection and has taught courses on the care of entomological specimens.

Whiffin is co-organiser of the UK carrion beetle species national biological recording scheme, she has written about carrion beetles for popular science magazines and in 2021 published a UK species atlas and identification guide on the Histeridae, Sphaeritidae and Silphidae of Britain and Ireland.

== Public outreach ==
Whiffin has published on how social media can be used to engage the public with museum collections, helping to develop the SCOPE framework.

She advocates about Scotland's wildlife to the media, highlighting the phenomenon of a non-biting midge swarms and was interviewed about how maths is used in her work and talked about her career and work on the UK Wildlife podcast in 2021.

She has given public talks such an introduction to beetles and about the collection at NMS, in 2018 she spoke at the EntoSci18 event for young entomologists at Harper Adams and in 2020 she was part of the panel event 'Sharing Stories' for National Insect Week.

In 2020 Whiffin was a judge for the Royal Entomological Society's National Insect Week 2020 Photography Competition, with Tim Cockerill and Nick Baker and sits on the Society's Outreach Committee.

In 2023 Whiffin appears on BBC Winterwatch talking with Gillian Burke about the insects in Warriston Cemetery, Edinburgh.
