= May Berenbaum =

American entomologist (born 1953)

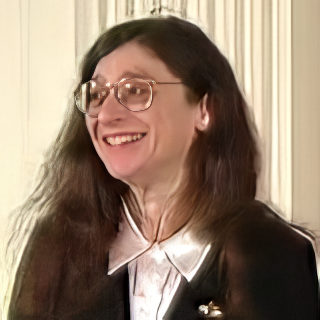
- May Berenbaum, 2014
- Born: July 22, 1953 (age 73); Trenton, New Jersey
- Education: Yale University; Cornell University
- Awards: National Medal of Science (2014); Tyler Prize for Environmental Achievement (2011); Public Engagement with Science (2009)
- Scientific career
- Fields: Entomology
- Workplaces: University of Illinois Urbana-Champaign
- Thesis: Furanocoumarin Chemistry, Insect Herbivory, and Coevolution in the Umbelliferae (1980)
- Doctoral advisor: Paul Feeny
- Website: https://sib.illinois.edu/profile/maybe

May Roberta Berenbaum (born July 22, 1953) is an American entomologist, who is a professor of entomology at University of Illinois Urbana-Champaign. Her research focuses on the chemical interactions between herbivorous insects and their host plants, and the implications of these interactions on the organization of natural communities and the evolution of species. She is particularly interested in nectar, plant phytochemicals, honey and bees, and her research has important implications for beekeeping.

She is a member of the National Academy of Sciences and was named editor-in-chief of its journal, Proceedings of the National Academy of Sciences in 2019; she is also a member of the American Philosophical Society (1996), and a fellow of the American Academy of Arts and Sciences (1996). She has held a Maybelle Leland Swanlund Endowed Chair in entomology since 2012, which is the highest title a professor can hold at the University of Illinois. In 2014, she was awarded the National Medal of Science.

== Early life and education ==
Berenbaum graduated summa cum laude, with a B.S. degree and honors in biology, from Yale University in 1975. Berenbaum discovered an interest in entomology after taking a course on terrestrial arthropods only because it fit her schedule, and found a second passion by taking an elective course in plant biochemistry. After attending a research seminar on chemical ecology by Paul Feeny, she decided to integrate her interests in entomology and botany, and began a PhD supervised by Feeny at Cornell University. Berenbaum received her Ph.D. in ecology and evolutionary biology in 1980.

== Research ==
Berenbaum is known for her research into the chemistry of honey and its importance as a functional food for bees and wasps in the superfamily Apoidea. As of 2021, approximately 20,000 bee species are known, but there are also signs of declines in bee populations in many countries. Berenbaum's research has shown that honey contains phytochemicals that help bees to tolerate cold, resist pesticides, fight off infections, heal wounds, and live longer. Important phytochemicals include p-coumaric acid, quercetin, abscisic acid, anabasine, caffeine, gallic acid, kaempferol, and thymol. Furthermore, sick honeybees will choose among different types of honey and eat the one that contains the phytochemicals that can improve their health.

Berenbaum's work has important implications, suggesting changes to practices in the beekeeping industry which may help bees to survive. One conclusion is that floral diversity matters: bees that have the opportunity to make honey from a diverse range of flowers will be healthier bees. As well, beekeepers should leave their bees a variety of different honeys, gathered at different times from different plants, so that they have a "honey pharmacy" to choose from when ill.

== Career ==
Since 1980, Berenbaum has been a member of the faculty of the department of entomology at the University of Illinois Urbana-Champaign and has served as head of the department since 1992.

In 1996, she was elected a Fellow of the American Academy of Arts and Sciences and she was elected a member of the American Philosophical Society in the same year. She served as the editor of Annual Review of Entomology from 1997 until 2018, and was named editor-in-chief of Proceedings of the National Academy of Sciences USA in 2019.

She has also chaired two National Research Council committees, the Committee on the Future of Pesticides in U.S. Agriculture (2000) and the Committee on the Status of Pollinators in North America (2007).

She has written numerous magazine articles, as well as books about insects for the general public:

- Ninety-nine gnats, nits, and nibblers (1989)
- Ninety-nine more maggots, mites, and munchers (1993)
- Bugs in the system: insects and their impact on human affairs (1995)
- Buzzwords: a scientist muses on sex, bugs, and rock'n roll (2000)
- Earwig's tail: a modern bestiary of multi-legged legends (2009)
- Honey, I'm homemade: sweet treats from the beehive across the centuries and around the world (2010)

Berenbaum has also gained some measure of fame as the organizer of the Insect Fear Film Festival at the University of Illinois Urbana-Champaign.

== Personal life ==
Berenbaum is a strict vegetarian in her personal life. She has researched and taught entomophagy to her students, but never eats insects herself.

== Awards and honors ==
- A character in The X-Files was named after her: Dr. Bambi Berenbaum, a famous entomologist and love-
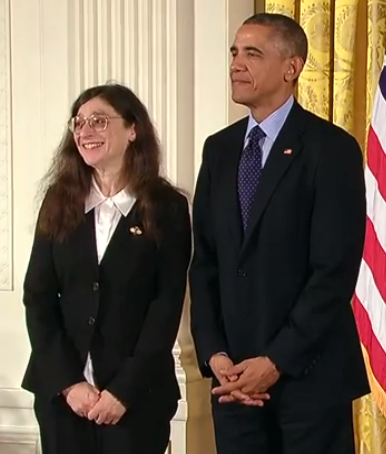
  Dr. Berenbaum with President Obama
  interest of Agent Mulder.
- She is the recipient of the 1996 Entomological Society of America North Central Branch Distinguished Teaching Award
- Awarded the prestigious Ecological Society of America Robert MacArthur Award in 2004 for outstanding contributions to ecology
- Berenbaum received the 2009 Public Understanding of Science and Technology Award from the American Association for the Advancement of Science.
- She is an Honorary Member of the British Ecological Society.
- In March 2011, she was awarded the University of Southern California's Tyler Prize for Environmental Achievement.
- In 2012, she was named a Swanlund Chair at the University of Illinois
- In 2012, she received the Edward O. Wilson Biodiversity Technology Award
- In November 2014, she had her first new species named after her, a cockroach, Xestoblatta berenbaumae (Evangelista, Kaplan, & Ware 2015).
- On October 3, 2014, President Barack Obama awarded the National Medal of Science to Berenbaum. She received the medal in a White House ceremony on November 20, 2014.

== Selected works ==
- Berenbaum, M., Miller, J. R., & Miller, T. A. (1988). Insect-Plant Interactions. New York: Springer.
- Berenbaum, M. (1989). Ninety-nine Gnats, Nits, and Nibblers. Urbana: University of Illinois Press.
- Rosenthal, G. A., & Berenbaum, M. R. (1992). Herbivores: Their Interactions with Secondary Plant Metabolites. (Herbivores.) San Diego: Academic Press.
- Berenbaum, M. (1993). Ninety-nine More Maggots, Mites, and Munchers. Urbana: University of Illinois Press.
- Berenbaum, M. (1996). Bugs in the System: Insects and their Impact on Human Affairs. Reading, Mass: Addison-Wesley.
- Berenbaum, M. R. (2001). Buzzwords: A Scientist Muses on Sex, Bugs, and Rock'n Roll. Washington, DC: Joseph Henry Press.
- Jeffords, M. R., Post, S. L., Warwick, C., & Berenbaum, M. (2008). Biologists in the Field: Stories, Tales, and Anecdotes from 150 Years of Field Biology. Champaign, Ill: Illinois Natural History Survey.
- Berenbaum, M. R. (2009). Earwig's Tail - a Modern Bestiary of Multi-legged Legends. Harvard University Press
- Berenbaum, M. R. (2010). Honey, I'm Homemade: Sweet Treats from the Beehive Across the Centuries and Around the World. Urbana: University of Illinois Press.
- Sadava, D. E., Hillis, D. M., Heller, H. C., & Berenbaum, M. (2014). Life: The Science of Biology. 10th ed.
- Berenbaum, May R.; Calla, Bernarda (2021-01-07). "Honey as a Functional Food for Apis mellifera". Annual Review of Entomology. 66 (1). Annual Reviews: 185–208. doi:10.1146/annurev-ento-040320-074933. ISSN 0066-4170. PMID 32806934. S2CID 221165130.
- Berenbaum, M. R. (2023). “Debugging” insect-related conspiracy theories. Annals of the Entomological Society of America, Article saad018. Advance online publication. https://doi.org/10.1093/aesa/saad018
