= Centipede Horror =

1982 Hong Kong film by Keith Li

- Promotional release poster
- Traditional Chinese: 蜈蚣咒
- Simplified Chinese: 蜈蚣咒
- Hanyu Pinyin: Wǔgōng zhōu
- Directed by: Keith Li
- Written by: Amy Chan Suet-Ming
- Produced by: Stephen Chan Chu-kwong
- Starring: Michael Miu; Tien-Lang Li
- Cinematography: Lee Yip; Philip Ma Kam-cheung
- Production companies: Sunlight Film Productions Ltd.; Nikko Int'l Productions & Films (H.K.) Ltd.
- Release date: 29 October 1982
- Running time: 93 minutes
- Country: Hong Kong
- Language: Cantonese

Centipede Horror (Chinese: 蜈蚣咒) is a 1982 Hong Kong horror film directed by Keith Li. It stars Michael Miu as Pak, a student who travel to South East Asia. On arriving she is poisoned by centipedes. Her condition grows worse and she eventually dies with centipedes burrowing out of her wounds. Her brother, Kai-lum learns that their grandfather accidentally killed the inhabitants of the village, leading to a local magician to curse the family with a centipede spell and now has put a spell on Kai-lum's girlfriend Yeuk-chee.

== Plot summary ==
Two friends, Pak and Chee, visit Singapore to investigate the death of Pak's sister Kay. They soon learn that Kay fell victim to the powerful "centipede spell", and find themselves threatened by a magician who seeks revenge for a crime committed by their grandfather years prior.

== Cast ==
- Michael Miu as Pak
- Tien-Lang Li as Chee
- Lai Fun Chan as Kay
- Hussein Abu Hassan as Evil Sorcerer

== Production ==
Prior to working on Centipede Horror, Keith Li worked as an assistant to directors like Chang Cheh and Li Hanxiang, and was also a script supervisor for the film "72 Tenants" directed by Chor Yuen. Later, he became a disciple and served as Chor Yuen's assistant director for many years.

Centipede Horror is the only Category III Hong Kong film written by a woman: writer and actress, Amy Chan Suet-Ming.

== Release and reception ==
Centipede Horror was released on October 29, 1982. It earned a total of HK$4,064,981 in Hong Kong.

The director of the film reportedly died in 2020, with news agency Ming Pao describing Centipede Horror as one of the director's "representative works". John Charles, Ming Pao and Daniel O'Brien highlighted one scene, which Charles described as "infamous for a sequence in which actress Tien-Lang Li vomits up a horde of live centipedes."

Charles Strong in his book The Hong Kong Filmography, 1977-1997 (2000) described the film as a "effectively gruesome but otherwise undistinguished" and that it was only "moderately entertaining." Meagan Navarro of the horror website Bloody Disgusting found that the films plot quickly became convoluted and nonsensical while concluding that "the reality is that this movie is too bonkers for that to be a major sticking point"

=== Home media ===
The film was released on VHS by World Video and LaserDisc by Winson Entertainment.

In April 2020, a restoration of the film by the American Genre Film Archive (AGFA) sourced from a 35 mm film print was made available to rent on video-on-demand (VOD). In 2022, a 2K restoration of the film was released on Blu-ray by Error_4444, a label that distributes Asian films. Prior to this release, Centipede Horror had not received an official home media release in the United States.
