= MANTIS (space telescope) =

MANTIS (Monitoring Activity from Nearby Stars with UV Imaging and Spectroscopy)
- Mission type: Space telescope
- Operator: NASA

Start of mission
- Launch date: 2026 (planned)

Orbital parameters
- Reference system: Geocentric

MANTIS (Monitoring Activity from Nearby Stars with UV Imaging and Spectroscopy) is a planned NASA space telescope. MANTIS will study the emission of ultraviolet (UV) radiation of stars, especially in the extreme UV range, to judge the habitability of planets orbiting them. The telescope will be built by the University of Colorado Boulder as a cubesat at a cost of $8.5 million.

Ultraviolet radiation and stellar flares can impact the habitability of planets. For many stars, MANTIS will perform the first measurements of extreme UV emissions.
