= Praying mantis (disambiguation) =

A praying mantis is, broadly, any of the thousands of insects in the order Mantodea, though the name is often associated specifically with the species Mantis religiosa.

Praying mantis may also refer to:

== Arts and entertainment ==
- Praying Mantis (1983 film), a film directed by Jack Gold
- Praying Mantis (film), an American psychological thriller film
- Praying Mantis (band), a British hard rock band
- "Praying Mantis" (Duty Free), a 1984 television episode
- The Praying Mantises (also known as Praying Mantis in the UK), a 1960 novel by Hubert Monteilhet

== Military ==
- Operation Praying Mantis, a 1988 naval battle between US and Iranian forces
- Praying Mantis, a British prototype light tank Universal Carrier of World War II

== Martial arts ==
- Northern Praying Mantis, the Northern Chinese martial art from Shandong
- Southern Praying Mantis, the Southern Chinese martial art of the Hakka people

== See also ==
- Mantis (disambiguation)
