= Natural History Building =

- Natural History Building (NHB)
- U.S. National Register of Historic Places
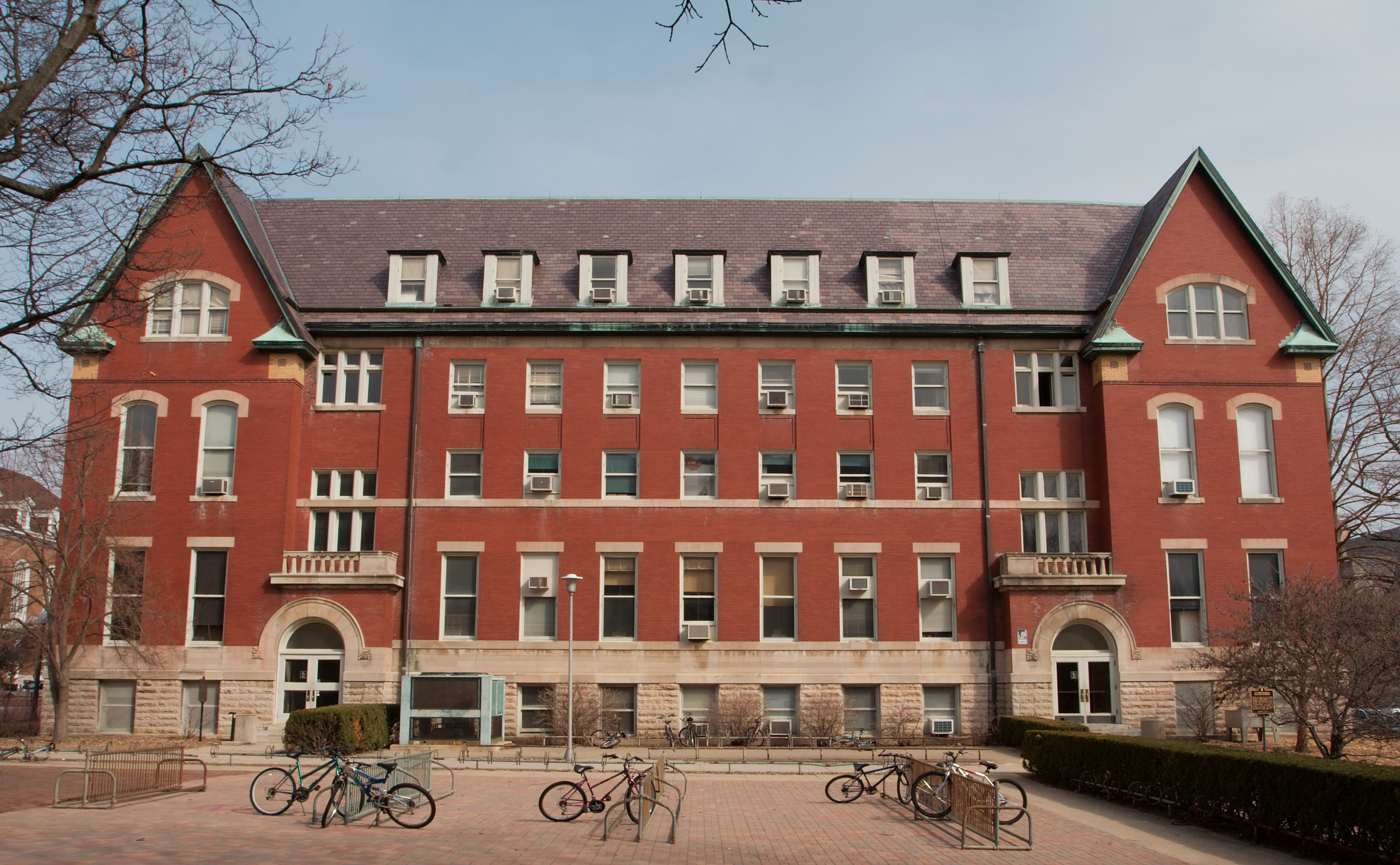

- Location within Illinois Location within the United States
- Location: 1301 W. Green St., Urbana, Illinois
- Coordinates: 40°6′34″N 88°13′33″W
- Area: less than one acre
- Built: 1892
- Architect: Ricker, Nathan Clifford
- Architectural style: High Victorian Gothic
- MPS: University of Illinois Buildings by Nathan Clifford Ricker TR
- NRHP reference No.: 86003147
- Added to NRHP: November 9, 1986

The Natural History Building is a historic building on the campus of the University of Illinois at Urbana–Champaign in Urbana, Illinois. Built in 1892, the building originally housed the university's departments of botany, zoology, and geology. In addition to classroom space, the building also included a natural history museum. Architect Nathan Clifford Ricker designed the High Victorian Gothic building. The red brick building has a rough stone foundation and is decorated with colored brick and stone. The steep roof is supported by a timber truss system; the exposed trusses create a coffered ceiling on the interior.

The building was added to the National Register of Historic Places on November 9, 1986. In 2010, it was evacuated due to structural deficiencies. After an extensive, $79 million renovation, it reopened in August 2017 and now houses the School of Earth, Society, and Environment (SESE) including the Departments of Climate, Meteorology, and Atmospheric Sciences (CliMAS), Earth Science and Environmental Change (ESEC), and Geography and Geographic Information Systems (GGIS), as well as teaching space for the School of Integrative Biology (SIB).

In 2019, the building received Leadership in Energy and Environmental Design Gold status for its renovation being conducted in an environmentally efficient manner, which included using renewable materials, utilizing energy-efficient technology, and focusing on natural lighting.
