= Jizzle (book) =

Short story collection by John Wyndham

First edition (publ. Dennis Dobson)

Jizzle (ISBN 0-234-77645-5) is a collection of thirteen science-fiction short stories and two novelettes by John Wyndham, published in 1954.

== Contents ==
- "Jizzle" (1949)
- "Technical Slip" (1949), as by John Beynon
- "A Present from Brunswick" (1951)
- "Chinese Puzzle" (1953), novelette
- "Esmeralda"
- "How Do I Do?" (1953)
- "Una", novelette, variant of "The Perfect Creature" (1937)
- "Affair of the Heart" (1952)
- "Confidence Trick" (1953)
- "The Wheel" (1952)
- "Look Natural, Please!"
- "Perforce to Dream" (1954)
- "Reservation Deferred" (1953)
- "Heaven Scent"
- "More Spinned Against" (1953)

== Plot summaries ==
Jizzle
the title story Jizzle refers to a monkey purchased by a man working in a circus side-show. The monkey, apparently named Jizzle as a mis-pronunciation of Giselle, has the ability to draw portraits of anyone placed in front of her, and her new owner exploits this talent in the circus. Jealousy builds up between the monkey and the man's wife, culminating when the man finds a picture Jizzle has drawn of his wife apparently sleeping with his friend. After his wife leaves, as a result of the picture, the man begins to tire of Jizzle and mistreats her, eventually giving her away to another worker at the circus. A few days later the new owner appears with Jizzle and a picture she has drawn of the new owner's wife and the old owner in bed together. As the new owner exacts his revenge, Jizzle smirks.
Technical Slip
deals with the aftermath of a bureaucratic error by a demonic trader. A corporate bureaucracy gives a wealthy old man extra life by taking him back to an earlier part of his life. Crucially, it leaves his memories intact, meaning that he has a chance to alter the "future".
A Present from Brunswick
sees the Pied Piper of Hamelin's enchanted pipe reappearing in America after World War II, with unforeseen consequences for the inhabitants of a small town.
Chinese Puzzle
deals with the egg of a Chinese dragon hatching in Wales, much to the astonishment of the local populace. Originally published in Argosy, this story inspired Peter Rudland's design for the cover of early editions.
Esmeralda
is a performing flea. Though she never managed the bicycle trick, her greatest stunt involved unwittingly sorting out her owner's love-life.
How Do I Do?
sees a young woman meeting her future self. Her first thought upon travelling to the future or to the past? Buying a new wardrobe.
Una
sees a genetically created creature fall in love with one of the people who come to investigate its creator's lab. Originally published in Argosy, this story also appears in The Best of John Wyndham (a.k.a. The Man from Beyond) under the title "The Perfect Creature").
Affair of the Heart
tells of a man who has proposed to the same woman on the same day for over thirty years. Why, then, does he commit suicide after the 32nd date?
Confidence Trick
tells of an Underground train-journey to hell itself, and the effects of belief on the part of the travellers. This story inspired the cover artwork for later editions.
The Wheel
takes a brief look at the religiously devout survivors of a near-apocalyptic catastrophe for a humanoid race.
Look Natural, Please!
presents the story of an iconoclastic young photographer who becomes part of the artistic establishment.
Perforce to Dream
sees two women discovering that not only have they independently written two near-identical novels based on their recurring dreams, but that many other women share these very same dreams. This story originally appeared in Women's Journal.
Reservation Deferred
sees a ghost visit a dying teenage woman and change her views about the male-designed afterlife.
Heaven Scent
originally published in Everybody's, is the story of the scheming secretary of a brilliant inventor.
More Spinned Against
(which first appeared in Argosy), tells of how the legendary Arachne finds herself in the clutches of a spider-obsessed collector and of the deal she makes with the collector's wife Lydia.

Selected stories from this collection make up the bulk of the material collected in Tales of Gooseflesh and Laughter.

== Adaptations ==
- "Maria" (1961), episode of the series Alfred Hitchcock Presents, directed by Boris Sagal, based on short story "Jizzle"
