= Bugscope =

Bugscope is a web-based science outreach program that connects K-12 classrooms with microscopists at the Beckman Institute for Advanced Science and Technology at UIUC to explore insects under a high-powered scanning electron microscope (SEM). Launched in 1998, Bugscope allows students to observe microscopic details of insects and other organisms, sparking curiosity and fostering scientific discovery. The program has reached students globally, offering live, interactive sessions that align with educational standards.

== Award ==
The Science Prize for Online Resources in Education (SPORE) from AAAS was awarded to Bugscope for its impact on science education in 2011.
