= Centipede! =

Centipede! is a 2004 horror film directed by Gregory Gieras, starring Larry Casey, Margaret Cash, and Trevor Murphy. The film is also known as The Tentacles.

== Plot ==
David Stone, his ex-girlfriend Sara and a group of six friends—a mix of men and women, including one with a severe fear of insects— travel to the remote Shankali region near Hyderabad, India, to explore an uncharted underground cave system. After meeting their guide, Kafi, they descend several miles below the surface, excited for the adventure. However, things take a dark turn when a powerful underground earthquake traps them in the cave, severing their only route back to the surface. As they scramble to find an escape, they discover they are not alone—giant, deadly centipedes inhabit the cave, and the group must fight for survival against these monstrous creatures as they attempt to find their way out before it's too late.

== Production ==
The film was presented as having been filmed in India.

== Reception ==
A very mixed review in Dread Central, albeit noting positively that the film makes no usage of CGI, concluded, "Is Centipede! scary? No. Will it satisfy those that like their monster movies bloody? I doubt it. The version of the film I'm reviewing is the one that premiered on the Sci-Fi Channel, it didn't really seem to have much that needed cutting out in the gore and profanity department and it doesn't appear there is any nudity that needed to be cut out either, which is too bad because again, Margaret Cash is quite hot."

The film has also been described as an "awful bug horror". A review on the French website HorrorScaryweb called the film "deadly boring". Le Figaro recommended it to fans of old-fashioned horror.

The film was also one of the featured films at the 26th Annual Insect Fear Film Festival (2009) at UIUC.

== See also ==
- Centipede (video game)

== Links ==
- Centipede! at IMDb
