= Touch Detective =

2006 video game

- Developer: BeeWorks
- Publishers: JP: Success Corporation; NA: Atlus USA; PAL: 505 Games
- Directors: Takahiro Anto; Shingo Kawai
- Producers: Masaru Saitō; Takashi Isoyama; Takayuki Machida
- Designers: Takeshi Tominaga; Takahiro Anto
- Programmer: Takuji Imai
- Writer: Takahiro Anto
- Composer: Toshiko Tasaki
- Platforms: Nintendo DS, iOS, Android, Nintendo Switch
- Release: Nintendo DS: JP: April 13, 2006; NA: October 24, 2006; EU: March 23, 2007; AU: May 3, 2007; iOS: WW: August 4, 2011; Android: WW: December 27, 2012; Nintendo Switch: JP: October 6, 2022; WW: March 28, 2024
- Genre: Adventure
- Mode: Single-player

Touch Detective (おさわり探偵 小沢里奈, Osawari Tantei: Ozawa Rina; literally "Touch Detective: Rina Ozawa") or Mystery Detective in Europe (except in France) is a point-and-click mystery adventure game for the Nintendo DS which makes use of the device's touch screen. It was developed by BeeWorks and released in Japan by Success Corporation. It was published in the United States by Atlus USA, and in the PAL region by 505 Games.

Touch Detective was released for the iOS on August 4, 2011. Its first chapter is free to download. The game was released for Nintendo Switch as part of a compilation game titled Touch Detective 3 + The Complete Case Files, for Japan in October 2022, and worldwide in March 2024.

== Gameplay ==
The player controls the titular detective Mackenzie as she solves four mysteries in the small town of Osawari. Both the art style and the plot reflect a subtle fantasy mood – for example, the first case is to track down a thief who is stealing someone's dreams. GameZone reviewer Steven Hopper notes that the game features a unique aesthetic that feels like a Tim Burton version of a Jhonen Vasquez comic. Aside from the main plots, there are also a number of small bonus mysteries that involve much simpler tasks. There is also a Touch Notebook containing a list of major items in the game the player has touched.

The game is entirely controlled via the touch screen. Tapping a location on the screen will talk to a character or examine an object. The player has an inventory of items collected, and may use them on other items or objects in the environment. The player can also communicate with the characters along conversation trees or present inventory items to them to learn new information. Mackenzie's pet mushroom, Funghi, is used as an aid in some puzzles.

== Characters ==
- Rina Ozawa (小沢 里奈, Ozawa Rina) / Mackenzie is the lead character of the game. As a young girl, she runs a detective agency with the help of Cromwell. Her personality is the most "ordinary", in contrast to the otherwise bizarre world around her. Although she's the most mature out of her friends, she can also often gain a typically childish amusement from doing "naughty" thing. She keeps a "Touch List" of things she has touched and what they feel like.
- Manami (まなみ) / Penelope is one of the girls that lives in the condominiums in town and friend of Mackenzie. Her parents are very rich, and thus she enjoys a lavish lifestyle, but she is rather air-headed, and has been known to disappear for a time, or even not talk to anyone (including herself, except for pantomime) for a whole week. She is the one who will give Mackenzie all her cases during the game and is one of the main focuses of the first three episodes.
- Chitose (ちとせ) / Chloe is another girl in town, and while friend of Mackenzie, tends to be her rival in trying to solve cases. Chloe generally takes actions before figuring out their consequences on herself or those around her, such when she broke into and ransacked Penelope's apartment for evidence.
- Jii (じい) / Cromwell is a butler for Mackenzie and also a genius inventor. Cromwell is a man who has worked for Mackenzie's family for over 300 years. He is often coming up with inventions, and becomes disgruntled if he isn't given the chance to show them off to others.
- Nameko (なめこ) / Funghi is a living mushroom that is kept as a pet by Mackenzie and travels with her as she moves about town.
- Deijī (デイジー ) / Daisy is a goth girl that works at the local boutique, and lives in the apartment above Penelope, having to put up with her loud "ditzy" antics as a result. At first hostile towards Penelope and Mackenzie, she becomes friendly later on.

== Plot ==
Screenshot from Touch Detective

Mackenzie learns that in order to join the ranks of the Great Detective Society, she must solve four cases and submit her investigation report to the Society. Fortunately for her, several cases seem to pop up around town.

Episode 1 - Robbery. The reality of a fanciful dream
Penelope comes to Mackenzie because she claims her dreams are being stolen. Mackenzie first acquires a special invention from Cromwell so that she can see into Penelope's dreams and understands what happens: a strange creature is seen fleeing from Penelope's just before she wakes up. Mackenzie investigates further and finds a way to enter the Dream World, but finds no one there that can help because the rest of the town is not yet asleep. Finding a way to convince everyone to fall asleep at the same time that Penelope does, she is then able to stop the fleeing figure and reveal it to be the pastry chef in town. The chef admits to the crime, using the crystallized dreams as an ingredient in her Sweet Dream Cake dessert, but Penelope and the chef agree that the chef will only take Penelope's dreams once a week.

Episode 2 - Disappearance. The truth hidden in the cosmos
Penelope goes missing, and upon investigation, it looks like her room was broken into. It is later revealed that Chloe, trying to find Penelope before Mackenzie, broke in and tried to find evidence, but regardless of Chloe's bumbling, Mackenzie is led to the planetarium and its strange owner, as well as a little girl named Lynsey who seems to like playing with dolls. After catching the owner buying girls clothes in sizes too large for Lynsey, Mackenzie soon discovers that the planetarium owner lured Penelope and now is keeping her in a secret room under mind control in order for her to be Lynsey's friend. Mackenzie is able to rescue Penelope, have the owner captured, and befriends Lynsey so she won't be lonely again.

Episode 3 - Stranded. The miracle of an innocent heart
Penelope claims that an ice fairy is stranded at the ice skating rink, the only cold place in town, but Mackenzie cannot see it though she can sense it. The owner of the rink is tired of living in the cold and is looking to shut the rink down, causing the temperature in the rink to rise and threaten the life of the fairy. Chloe comes up with two near-disastrous ideas for saving the fairy, but Mackenzie realizes all they need to do is make it snow so the fairy can be get out from the ice rink and to a more comfortable location. With the help of the local fortune teller Mackenzie helps Chloe in enchanting an "angel summoning spell" (actually a magical girl theme song), which, through the power of Chloe's will, temporarily transforms Penelope into an angel that can make it snow. The fairy returns home after a parting conversation with Chloe, with it being heavily implied that they share a requited crush.

Episode 4 - Assault. The tragedy of a past grudge
Penelope claims that a murder happened at the circus in town, though it is only a flea circus, and it is actually an assault. Apparently, the circus used to be a larger attraction, but when it shut down, many of the performers took up residence in town. Mackenzie investigates to find that something did attack the fleas, though initially suspecting a flea as the culprit, but the supposed culprit flea ends up near-dead himself, in a supposed locked room attack. This leads to an initial speculation of self-inflicted injury, but Mackenize deduces that a human sized culprit could have picked up the box the flea was in and shaken it to cause the injuries. When a large anvil nearly kills all the fleas, the trail leads to Dover, one of the ex-performers. His old circus act, animating tattoos on his back, was ruined due to a flea bite, and has been out of work since, and thus took revenge on the flea circus to try to get back into stardom. Dover tries to kill a flea, although Mackenzie is able to stop him, but the circus ringleader accidentally kills it anyway.

Following the successful resolution of all four cases, Cromwell informs Mackenzie that she has been accepted into the Great Detective Society, but it transpires that he mistakenly submitted Mackenzie's "Touch List" instead of her investigation report. She is given the official title of "Touch Detective" as a result, to Mackenzie's shame.

== Reception ==
Reception

Aggregate score
Aggregator	Score	
Aggregator	DS	iOS
Metacritic	60/100	63/100

Review scores
Publication	Score	
Publication	DS	iOS
Adventure Gamers	3/5	N/A
Electronic Gaming Monthly	5.17/10	N/A
Eurogamer	N/A	7/10
Famitsu	26/40	N/A
Game Informer	6.75/10	N/A
GamePro	3.75/5	N/A
GameSpot	6/10	N/A
GameSpy	2/5	N/A
Gamezebo	N/A	3/5
GameZone	7.5/10	N/A
IGN	5.5/10	N/A
Nintendo Power	6/10	N/A
RPGFan	80/100	N/A
TouchArcade	N/A	3/5

The DS and iOS versions received "mixed" reviews according to the review aggregation website Metacritic. In Japan, Famitsu gave the former a score of two sevens and two sixes for a total of 26 out of 40.

== Legacy ==
A sequel, Touch Detective 2 ½, was released in 2007.

In Japan, the character of Funghi became widely popular and a Funghi Gardening Kit (おさわり探偵 なめこ栽培キット, Osawari Tantei: Nameko Saibai Kitto; or simply Mushroom Garden) game was released for the iPhone and iPad on June 30, 2011, and for Android on December 21. It released a "Seasons" version on December 2, which became the number 1 app in the App Store in Japan the following week. By the end of 2011, Seasons had been downloaded 1 million times from iTunes and the Android version, released around the same time, had reached 200 thousand downloads within a week of its release. By March 2012, Beeworks began selling character goods for the various different Funghi.

A spin-off called Osawari Tantei Nameko Daihanshoku was released for Nintendo 3DS in 2013, with a remake for the Nintendo Switch releasing worldwide in December 2018 called Funghi Puzzle: Funghi Explosion.

The third entry in the series, Touch Detective Rising 3: Does Funghi Dream Of Bananas? was released for the Nintendo 3DS in Japan in May 2014. All three main entries would be ported to the Nintendo Switch as Touch Detective: Rina and the Funghi Case Files in October 2022 and later released worldwide as Touch Detective 3 + The Complete Case Files in March 2024.
