= Foellinger Auditorium =

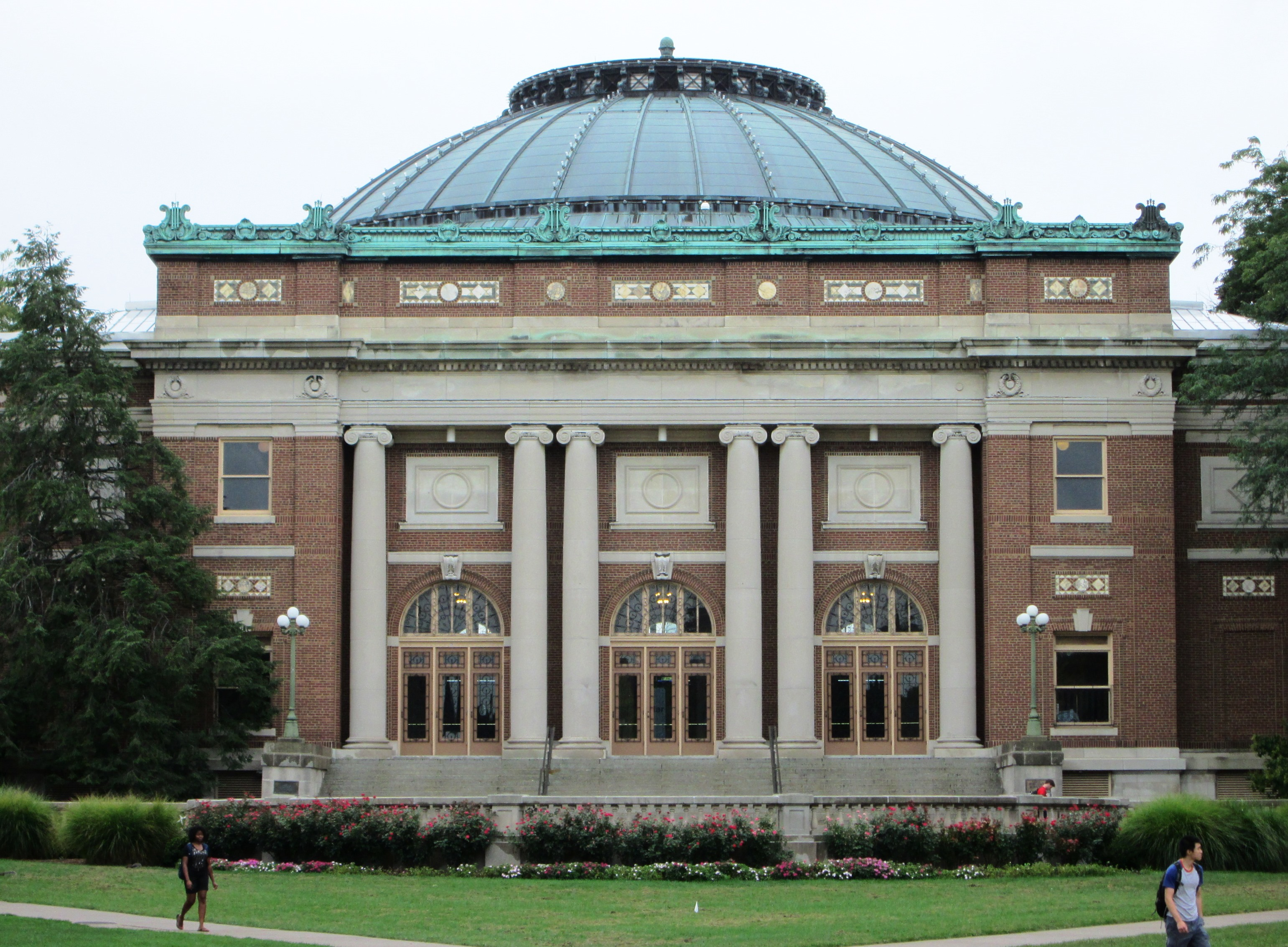
- (2013)

- Location within Illinois

General information
- Type: auditorium
- Location: University of Illinois Urbana-Champaign
- Coordinates: 40°06′21″N 88°13′38″W
- Construction started: 1907
- Completed: 1907
- Renovated: 1915, 1937, 1951, 1970, 1983-85

Design and construction
- Architect: Clarence H. Blackall

Other information
- Seating capacity: 1361

The Foellinger Auditorium, located at 709 S. Mathews Avenue in Urbana, Illinois, on the campus of the University of Illinois Urbana-Champaign, is a concert hall and the university's largest lecture hall. It is the southernmost building on the main quad. Its size and its dome make it one of the university's most recognizable buildings. The building was completed in 1907 and was designed by Clarence H. Blackall, a noted theatre designer, in the Beaux-Arts style. The building is essentially a circle with a 120-foot diameter covering 17,000 square feet, with a large vestibule on the north side, and 396 lights in its copper dome.

Originally dedicated to the composer Edward MacDowell, the building was rededicated on April 26, 1985, in honor of Helene Foellinger, whose gift to the university enabled the facility to undergo a major renovation.

== History ==
The idea for an Auditorium began in 1905 with the university's president, Edmund Janes James, who wanted to build a "noble monument" dedicated to the art of music. He wrote: "I am interested in having this the greatest hall of the kind in the Mississippi Valley". The university's trustees chose noted theatre designer and UI alumnus (Class of 1877) Clarence H. Blackall – who was responsible for the Wilbur and Colonial Theatres in Boston, among many others – and a site was chosen for the new building. Blackall later said about the location:

Our University of Illinois will focus about the Auditorium. This building is located upon the only commanding site of the entire grounds, at the crest of the slight rise towards the south from Green Street, where it will form the center of the growth for many years to come, so that ultimately this structure which now seems in a way too far to the south, will be surrounded on all sides by large and developed schools.

Blackall developed a design which was estimated to cost $200,000 to build. Unfortunately the state legislature only authorized $100,000 which necessitated Blackall making some drastic changes in his design, which originally called for an auditorium that would cover 30,000 square feet (2,800 m^{2}), have a copper dome with a smaller glass oculus, and 2,500 seats, as well as a south wing which would be the home for the School of Music. Blackall reduced the overall size of the building, had the dome constructed out of sheet metal, and eliminated the backstage areas, although he arranged the design in such a way as to allow the future addition of a backstage.

Despite the funding shortages, construction of what was originally called simply "the Auditorium" began and ended in 1907. It was constructed on a granite foundation of brick and Indiana limestone. Despite the deviations from Blackall's original plan, upon the building's completion and its two-day dedication on November 4 and 5, 1907, it was capable of holding 2,500 students, more than the entire student body at the time. The building was originally dedicated to the noted composer Edward MacDowell.

Blackall was not pleased about the changes necessitated by the budget shortfall. He complained to university architect James McLaren White in 1923: "My best wish for that building would be to have it go up in smoke some night, and somebody would have the chance to rebuild it right."

=== Sound problem ===
Several weeks before the dedication of the building was scheduled, Blackall learned that the hall was acoustically imperfect, with what President James called "A fearful echo." Fixing the hall's sound was assigned to the professors of the university's Physics Department, in particular Floyd Rowe Watson, who knew very little about acoustics, but spent six years solving the problem, after which he was a recognized authority of the subject. Remodeling of the interior in 1915 and 1937 were a part of the effort to fix the acoustical problem.

=== Sculpture ===
The Lorado Taft sculpture Alma Mater, which now stands outside Altgeld Hall, was originally placed outside the south end of the Auditorium, where two fragments of the sculptor's Fountain of Creation are now located.

== Renovations ==
The Auditorium was renovated in 1915, 1937, 1951 and 1970. The alterations to the interior in 1915 were intended to help the building's serious acoustical problem. The renovation in 1937 included a major seat replacement project, which reduced the seating capacity from 2,500 to 1,936 seats. The renovation also added dressing rooms and the interior dome ceiling was lowered to help eliminate the echo. Also, some decorative elements were removed.

In 1951, changes were made to bring the building into compliance with fire codes. These included adding fire doors throughout the building and separating the stairwells from the lobby.

By 1970, many campus planners were suggesting that the now worn-out Auditorium be destroyed. However, thanks to a $3 million gift in 1983 from newspaper publisher Helene Foellinger (Class of 1932) of the Fort Wayne News-Sentinel, the auditorium was instead renovated again, built and refinished to Blackall's original design under the supervision of architect Walker Johnson, who utilized Blackall's original plans and drawings, as well as tinted lithographs. Wings and a backstage area were added – a total of 6,000 square feet – a new wooden stage floor was installed, seating was replaced, and the sheet metal dome was replaced with a copper one with a 4.5 foot pineapple and 396 embedded lights. In addition the stage lighting and audio system were improved. A rededication ceremony was held on April 26, 1985, when the name of the building was changed to "Foellinger Auditorium".

As part of the renovation, the seating capacity was reduced to 1,750. Of these, 915 are on the main floor, and 835 are in the balcony.

== Current uses ==
Foellinger Auditorium is currently used as a large lecture hall. The facility is also used for guest speakers, performances, concerts, and other events. According to the Auditorium's manager, around 17,000 students use the facility for class and another 5,000 to 10,000 attend various events each week.

The auditorium has a camera atop it which captures live video of the Main Quad, which can be accessed on the Illinois website.

Directly in front of the building, at the bottom of the stairs, there in a semi-circular forecourt area. Due to the architecture, when standing directly in the center, an echo can be heard by the speaker. This area is known as the "echo spot" to most students on the campus.

== Events ==
Speakers

- Jane Addams (1915)
- Maya Angelou (1996)
- Saul Bellow (1968)
- Julian Bond (1968)
- Margaret Bourke-White (1942)
- Ralph Bunche (1949)
- Admiral Richard Byrd (1931)
- Bruce Catton (1964)
- Bennett Cerf (1952)
- Henry Steele Commager (1962)
- Ève Curie (1940)
- Clarence Darrow (1918)
- Thomas Dewey (1939)
- John Dos Passos (1955)
- Amelia Earhart (1935)
- Clifton Fadiman (1954)
- Lawrence Ferlinghetti (1969)
- Dr, Eric Fromm (1968)
- Robert Frost (1926)
- Senator J. William Fulbright (1959)
- R. Buckminster Fuller (1974)
- John Kenneth Galbraith (1967)
- George McGovern (1972)
- Bill Gates (2004)
- Dr. Julian Huxley (1950)
- Alexander Kerensky (1944)
- Stanley Kramer (1971)
- Dr. Louis Leakey (1965)
- Sinclair Lewis (1921)
- Vachel Lindsay (1923)
- Ogden Nash (1955)
- Senator George Norris (1933)
- Barack Obama (2018)
- Vance Packard (1955)
- Drew Pearson (1944)
- Admiral Robert Peary (1916)
- Walter Reuther (1950)
- Eleanor Roosevelt (1956)
- Pierre Salinger (1968)
- Harrison Salisbury (1963)
- Carl Sandburg (1929)
- Adlai Stevenson III (1970)
- Norman Thomas (1944)
- Countess Alexandra Tolstoy (1949)
- Carl Van Doren (1925)
- Mark Van Doren (1958)
- Wernher von Braun (1959)
- General Leonard Wood (1919)
- Jesse Ventura (2004)

Performers

- John Philip Sousa (1909)
- Pablo Casals (1918)
- Efrem Zimbalist (1919)
- Jascha Heifetz (1924)
- Sergei Rachmaninoff (1924)
- Burl Ives (1940)
- Ezio Pinza (1940)
- Arthur Rubinstein (1940)
- Marian Anderson (1941)
- Helen Traubel (1943)
- Rudolf Serkin (1946)
- Duke Ellington (1948)
- Igor Stravinsky (1949)
- Royal Philharmonic Orchestra (1950)
- Charles Laughton (1953)
- Vaughn Monroe (1954)
- Richard Tucker (1954)
- Claude Rains (1955)
- Dave Brubeck (1956)
- José Greco (1958)
- Hal Holbrook (1960)
- Ravi Shankar (1961)
- Joan Baez (1962)
- Helen Hayes (1962)
- Carlos Montoya (1966)
- Dick Gregory (1967)
- Lil Wayne (2004)
- Wilco (2005)
- Relient K (2006)
- Moe (2006)
- Ben Folds (2007)
- Lupe Fiasco (2007)
- OK Go (2007)
- The Used (2008)
- Andrew Bird (2009)
- Matisyahu (2009)
- The Academy Is... (2009)
- Janelle Monáe (2011)
- fun. (2011)
- Baauer (2013)
- Casey James (2013)
- Grouplove (2013)
- Nick Offerman (2013)
- American Football (2016)
- Beach Bunny (2021)

== In popular culture ==
- Foellinger Auditorium was prominently displayed at the end of the 1994 movie With Honors when it served as the location for the film's graduation scene.
