= The High Bright Sun =

1964 British action film by Ralph Thomas

- Original British quad poster by Eric Pulford
- Directed by: Ralph Thomas
- Written by: Ian Stuart Black; Bryan Forbes (uncredited)
- Based on: novel The High Bright Sun by Ian Stuart Black
- Produced by: Betty E. Box
- Starring: Dirk Bogarde; Susan Strasberg; George Chakiris
- Cinematography: Ernest Steward
- Edited by: Alfred Roome
- Music by: Angelo Francesco Lavagnino
- Production company: J. Arthur Rank Organisation
- Distributed by: J. Arthur Rank Film Distributors (UK)
- Release date: February 1965
- Running time: 114 mins
- Country: United Kingdom
- Language: English

The High Bright Sun is a 1964 British action film directed by Ralph Thomas and starring Dirk Bogarde, George Chakiris and Susan Strasberg. It is set in Cyprus during the EOKA uprising against British rule in the 1950s. It was based on a 1962 novel by Ian Stuart Black.

The film was released in the US as McGuire, Go Home.

== Plot ==
In 1957, Juno, an American archaeology student, is visiting Cyprus and staying with the family of her father's best friend, Dr Andros. She witnesses an attack by two EOKA gunmen which results in the death of two British soldiers, but is unable to identify the killers to the local British intelligence officer, Major McGuire.

Juno then realises that fugitive EOKA General Skyros is hiding in the house and Dr Andros is an EOKA collaborator. EOKA fighter Haghios wants to kill Juno, in part because of her growing romantic relationship with McGuire.

Haghios organises an ambush to kill Juno, but she is saved by Dr Andros' son, Emile, who is mortally wounded. Juno escapes and is rescued by McGuire, who brings her to his apartment. Haghios leads an attack on McGuire's apartment, which is unsuccessful, in part because of help from fellow British intelligence officer, Baker, who had an affair with McGuire's wife.

Juno flies to Athens and realises that Haghios is on the plane. On arrival, Haghios tries to kill her again, mortally wounding Baker, but is shot dead by McGuire. Juno is reunited with McGuire.

== Cast ==
- Dirk Bogarde as Major McGuire
- George Chakiris as Haghios
- Susan Strasberg as Juno Kozani
- Denholm Elliott as Baker
- Grégoire Aslan as General Stavros Skyros
- Colin Campbell as Emile Andros
- Joseph Furst as Doctor Andros
- Katherine Kath as Mrs Andros
- George Pastell as Prinos
- Paul Stassino as Alkis
- Nigel Stock as Colonel Park
- Derek Partridge as MP Corporal (uncredited)

== Production ==
It was the first British feature film to depict the Cyprus Emergency. However, there had been a number of British TV plays on the subject prior to that including One Morning Near Troodos (1956), Arrow in the Air (1957), Air Mail from Cyprus (1958), Incident at Echo Six (1958) and The Interrogator (1961). There had also been Peter Barnes' stage play Sclerosis (1965) and the novels Violence in Paradise (1957), The Bad Summer (1958), Interrupted Journey (1958) and Ian Stuart Black's The High Bright Sun (1962), which formed the basis of the film.

Film rights to Black's novel were bought by Betty Box under the aegis of the Rank Organisation. Black was hired to do the screenplay. Later on, Box hired Bryan Forbes to do some additional work on the script, saying "he was paid rather a lot of money, I thought, for what he eventually produced". Box said this mostly consisted of a 12-minute scene between Denholm Elliott and Bogarde, and a few extra lines of dialogue.

In February 1964 Rank announced it would make eight films at a cost of £4.5 million, including The High Bright Sun which was to star an American and two British actors.

Shirley Anne Field was originally announced for the female lead but Rank wanted an international name. Box and Thomas tried Jane Fonda, Jean Seberg and Lee Remick but they turned the role down; Susan Strasberg was cast. George Chakiris played the second male lead.

It was said to be the most expensive film made by the team of Box and Thomas and the most ambitious film they had ever done. George Chakiris was paid $100,000, Strasberg $50,000 and Bogarde £30,000. Uniformed extras were provided from the Duke of Edinburgh's Royal Regiment based in Malta. Eli Wallach was mentioned as possible casting but ended up not appearing in the final film.

The character of Spyros was based on George Grivas.

=== Shooting ===
Filming began in June 1964. It took place on location for a month in Bari, Foggia and the Gargano in Southern Italy, which stood in for Cyprus. Cyprus was considered too dangerous to film, fighting having broken out there again in December 1963. The unit then transferred to Pinewood Studios. Northolt Airport stood in for Athens Airport.

Bogarde had made eight previous films with Box and Thomas and the three of them generally got along very well. However, on this film Bogarde was difficult and temperamental. It was the last film he made with Box and Thomas.

== Release ==
=== Critical ===
The movie's script and release downplayed the political implications of the film. Most contemporary reviews were poor, with criticism of the minimal mention of the Turkish population.

Sight and Sound wrote it "dodges the political issues and also fails to thrill. Well enough acted."

Filmink argued "the film was consistently interesting, though it doesn’t quite work – the Cyprus conflict was perhaps too hard for a company like the Rank Organisation to handle (for instance, the script barely mentions the Turks) and it was a box office disappointment, especially considering its cost." However it declared Bogarde's performance "as a complex, ruthless intelligence officer, was one of his best."

=== Box office ===
The movie was a disappointment at the box office.

According to Jonathan Stubbs, "the film depicts the decline of British rule without nostalgia, suggesting that the soldiers called upon to maintain British sovereignty during the Cyprus Emergency were disillusioned and bitterly disengaged from the values which traditionally underpinned traditional power."

Ralph Thomas later built a house in Cyprus near Kyrenia.

== Notes ==
- Stubbs, Jonathan (2015). "'Always ready to explode into violence!' Representing the Cyprus Emergency and decolonization in The High Bright Sun (1965)". Journal of European Popular Culture. 6 (2): 103–116. doi:10.1386/jepc.6.2.103_1.
