= Heinrich Müller (Gestapo) =

German police official and head of the Gestapo (1900–c.1945)

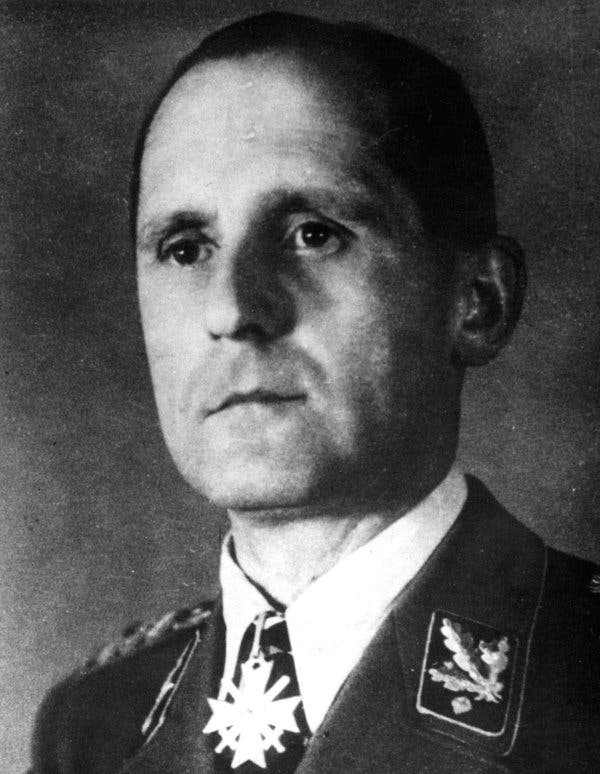
- Müller, c. 1941–1945

Director of the Gestapo
- In office 27 September 1939 – 1 May 1945
- Appointed by: Heinrich Himmler
- Preceded by: Reinhard Heydrich
- Succeeded by: Office abolished

Personal details
- Born: 28 April 1900 Munich, Kingdom of Bavaria; German Empire
- Died: May 1945 (aged 45) Berlin, Germany (assumed)
- Party: Nazi Party (1939–1945); Bavarian People's Party (until 1933)
- Civilian awards: Golden Party Badge
- Nickname: "Gestapo Müller"

Military service
- Allegiance: German Empire; Nazi Germany
- Service: Imperial German Army 1917–18; Munich Police 1919–33; Gestapo 1933–45
- Years of service: 1917–18 (military); 1933–45 (SS)
- Rank: SS-Gruppenführer
- Battles/wars: World War I
- Military awards: Knights Cross of the War Merit Cross with Swords; Iron Cross 1st Class with 1939 Clasp; Bavarian Military Merit Cross 2nd Class with Swords; Honour Cross of the World War 1914/1918

Heinrich Müller (28 April 1900; date of death unknown, but evidence points to May 1945) was a high-ranking German Schutzstaffel (SS) and police official during the Nazi era. For most of World War II in Europe, he was the chief of the Gestapo, the secret state police of Nazi Germany. Müller was central in the planning and execution of the Holocaust and attended the January 1942 Wannsee Conference, which formalised plans for the deportation and genocide of all Jews in German-occupied Europe—otherwise known as the "Final Solution to the Jewish question". He was referenced as "Gestapo Müller" to distinguish him from another SS general named Heinrich Müller.

He was last seen at the Reich Chancellery in Berlin on 1 May 1945 and remains the most senior figure of the Nazi regime who was never captured or confirmed to have died.

== Early life and career ==
Müller was born in Munich on 28 April 1900 to Catholic parents. His father had been a rural police official. Müller attended a Volksschule and completed an apprenticeship as an aircraft mechanic before the outbreak of the First World War. During the last year of the war, he served in the Luftstreitkräfte as a pilot for an artillery spotting unit. He was decorated several times for bravery (including the Iron Cross 1st and 2nd class, Bavarian Military Merit Cross 2nd Class with Swords and Bavarian Pilots Badge). After the war ended, he joined the Bavarian Police in 1919 as an auxiliary worker. Although not a member of the Freikorps, he was involved in the suppression of the communist risings in the early post-war years. After witnessing the shooting of hostages by the revolutionary "Red Army" in Munich during the Bavarian Soviet Republic, he acquired a lifelong hatred of communism. During the years of the Weimar Republic he was head of the Munich Political Police Department, having risen quickly through the ranks due to his spirited efforts.

== SS career ==
It was while serving in a police capacity in Munich that Müller first became acquainted with many members of the Nazi Party (NSDAP) including Heinrich Himmler and Reinhard Heydrich, although during the Weimar period he supported the Bavarian People's Party. On 9 March 1933, during the Nazi putsch that deposed the Bavarian government of Minister-President Heinrich Held, Müller advocated using force against the Nazis to his superiors. Ironically, these views aided Müller's rise as it guaranteed the hostility of the Nazis, thereby making Müller very dependent upon the patronage of Reinhard Heydrich, who in turn appreciated Müller's professionalism and skill as a policeman, and was aware of Müller's past. Once the Nazis seized power, Müller's knowledge of communist activities placed him in high demand; as a result he was promoted to Polizeiobersekretär in May 1933 and again to Criminal Inspector in November 1933. Historian Richard J. Evans wrote that:

Müller was a stickler for duty and discipline, and approached the tasks he was set as if they were military commands. A true workaholic who never took a vacation, Müller was determined to serve the German state, irrespective of what political form it took, and believed it was everyone's duty, including his own, to obey its dictates without question.

Evans also records that Müller was a regime functionary out of ambition, not out of a belief in National Socialism, indicated by an internal Nazi memorandum whose authors inquired how "so odious an opponent of the movement" could become head of the Gestapo, especially since he had once referred to Hitler as "an immigrant unemployed house painter" and "an Austrian draft-dodger". Nazi jurist and former police chief, SS-Obergruppenführer Werner Best opined Müller represented one of the "finest examples" of the limited connection between members of the NSDAP and the police before 1933.

After the Nazis came to power in 1933, Heydrich, as head of the Security Service (SD), recruited Müller, Franz Josef Huber and Josef Albert Meisinger, who were collectively referred to as the "Bajuwaren-Brigade" (Bavarian Brigade). Müller joined the Schutzstaffel (SS) in 1934. By 1936, with Heydrich head of the Gestapo, Müller was its operations chief. On 4 January 1937, an evaluation by the Nazi Party's Deputy Gauleiter of Munich-Upper Bavaria stated:

Criminal Police Chief Inspector Heinrich Müller is not a Party member. He has also never actively worked within the Party or in one of its ancillary organisations ...

Before the seizure of power, Müller was employed in the political department of the Police Headquarters. He did his duty both under the direction of the notorious Police President Koch [Julius Koch, the Munich Police President 1929–33], and under Nortz and Mantel. His sphere of activity was to supervise and deal with the left-wing movement ... [H]e fought against it very hard, sometimes in fact ignoring legal provisions and regulations ... But it is equally clear that, ... Müller would have acted against the Right in just the same way. With his enormous ambition and his marked 'pushiness' he would win the approval of his superiors ... In terms of his political opinions ... his standpoint varied between the German National People's Party and the Bavarian People's Party. But he was by no means a National Socialist.

As far as his qualities of character are concerned, these are regarded in an even poorer light than his political ones. He is ruthless, ... and continually tries to demonstrate his efficiency, but claims all the glory for himself.

In his choice of officials for the Bavarian Political Police he was very concerned to propose either officials who were more junior than himself or only those who were inferior in ability ... In this way he could keep rivals at bay. In his choice of officials he did not take account of political considerations, he only had his own egoistical aims in mind ...

The Gau leadership of Munich-Upper Bavaria cannot, therefore, recommend accelerated promotion for Müller because he has rendered no services to the National Uprising.

This assessment did not deter Heydrich from moving Müller along the ranks, particularly since Heydrich believed it was an advantage not to be bound to the influence of the Nazi Party. Functionaries like Müller were the sort of men Heydrich preferred since they were inherently committed to their "area of responsibility" and correspondingly justified any steps they deemed necessary against perceived enemies of the Nazi "racial community." Müller was promoted to the rank of Standartenführer (colonel) in 1937. Engrossing himself often in red-tape and statistics, Müller was a natural administrator who took solace in a "world of notes, memos, and regulations" and then received and transformed Gestapo reports of denouncements, torture, and secret executions into "administrative fodder." Despite the expense of so much mental energy in carrying out his duties, Müller disliked the scholarly types and once told Walter Schellenberg that "intellectuals should be sent down a coal mine and blown up."

British author and translator Edward Crankshaw described Müller as "the arch-type non-political functionary" who was "in love with personal power and dedicated to the service of authority, the State." General Walter Dornberger, the chief over the rocket research at Peenemünde, (under alleged Gestapo suspicion) was one of the few to ever interview with Müller and characterized him as "the unobtrusive type of police official who leaves no personal impression on the memory", but added that "all I could remember was a pair of piercing grey-blue eyes, fixed on me with an unwavering scrutiny. My first impression was one of cold curiosity and extreme reserve." American journalist and war correspondent William L. Shirer called Müller "a dapper-looking fellow" but shortly thereafter described him as "a cold, dispassionate killer".

Himmler biographer Peter Padfield wrote: "he [Müller] was an archetypal middle rank official: of limited imagination, non-political, non-ideological, his only fanaticism lay in an inner drive to perfection in his profession and in his duty to the state—which in his mind were one ... A smallish man with piercing eyes and thin lips, he was an able organiser, utterly ruthless, a man who lived for his work." Such was his dedication to the job that Auschwitz Commandant Rudolf Höss claimed one could reach Müller "any time of the day or night, even Sundays and public holidays."

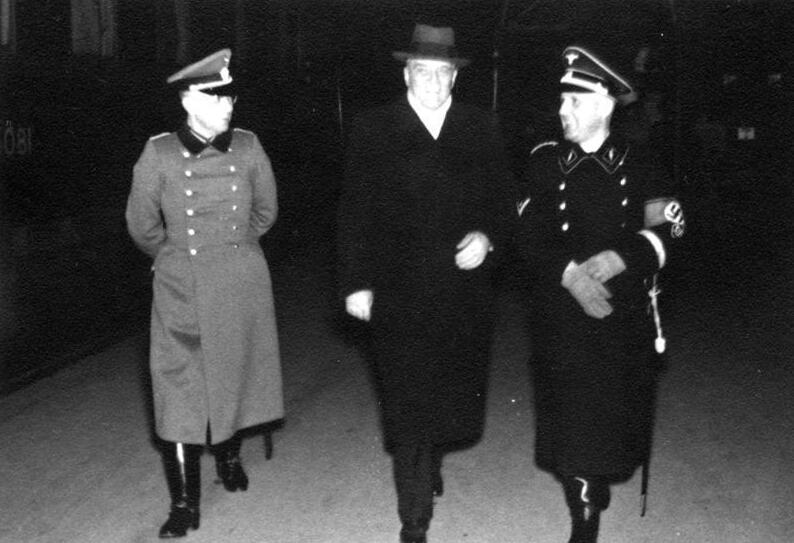
Berlin February 1939: Maj. v. Schweinichen; Dr. Boor; Müller

He was made Inspekteur der Sicherheitspolizei und des SD for all of Austria following the 1938 Anschluss, while his close friend Franz Josef Huber took charge of the Gestapo office in Vienna. One of Müller's first major acts occurred during the unprecedented Kristallnacht pogrom of 9–10 November 1938, when he ordered the arrest of between 20,000 and 30,000 Jews. (Note: Before Kristallnacht began, Müller informed members of the State police that there would be demonstrations against the Jews throughout Germany, but they were instructed by him that "no action" was to be taken.) Heydrich also tasked Müller during the summer of 1939 to create a centrally organized agency to deal with the eventual emigration of the Jews. Müller became a member of the Nazi Party in 1939 for the purely opportunist reason of improving his chances of promotion and only after Himmler insisted he do it. (Note: Müller had a high party number, 4,583,199, as a result.) Indeed, according to Walter Schellenberg, in a 1943 conversation Müller lauded the Stalinist system as superior to Nazism, which he believed compromised on too much. Schellenberg even alleged when Müller compared Stalin against Hitler, his (Müller's) opinion was that Stalin did things better. According to other sources, Müller was notorious in Nazi circles for admiring the Soviet police.

While the chief of the subsequent Reich Central Office for Jewish Emigration (Note: Hermann Göring had ordered the creation of the office on 24 January 1939.) was indeed Heydrich, it was Müller who took care of the office's administrative details. Shortly thereafter, Müller took charge of this office but then handed control over to Adolf Eichmann. Once the war began, the possibility of Jewish emigration ended and caused the office's dissolution.

== Gestapo chief ==
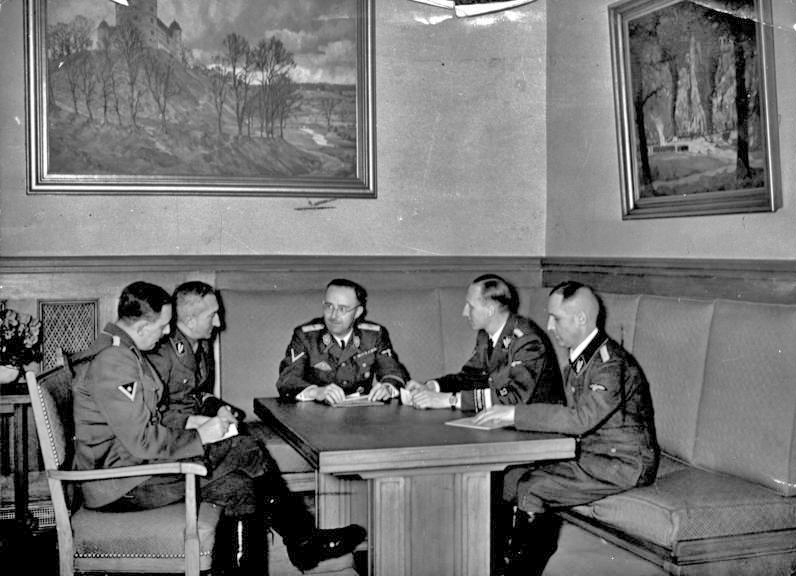
Left to right: Franz Josef Huber, Arthur Nebe, Heinrich Himmler, Reinhard Heydrich and Müller (1939)

In September 1939, when the Gestapo and other police organizations were consolidated under Heydrich into the Reich Security Main Office (RSHA), Müller was made chief of the RSHA "Amt IV" (Office or Dept. 4): Gestapo. To distinguish him from another SS general named Heinrich Müller, he was referred to as "Gestapo Müller".

As Gestapo chief of operations and later (September 1939 forward) head of the organization, Müller played a leading role in the detection and suppression of all forms of resistance to the Nazi regime. Trusted by both Heydrich and Himmler, Müller was pivotal in making the Gestapo the "central executive organ of National Socialist terror" according to historians Carsten Dams and Michael Stolle. Under his leadership, the Gestapo succeeded in infiltrating and to a large extent, destroying groups opposed to the Nazis, such as the underground networks of the left-wing Social Democratic Party and Communist Party. Along these lines, historian George C. Browder asserts that Müller's "expertise and his ardent hate for Communism guaranteed his future".

When Hitler and his army chiefs asked for a pretext for the invasion of Poland in 1939, Himmler, Heydrich, and Müller masterminded and carried out a false flag project code-named Operation Himmler. During one of the operations, the clandestine mission to a German radio station on the Polish border, Müller helped collect a dozen or so condemned men from camps, who were then dressed in Polish uniforms. In exchange for their participation, the men were told by Müller that "they would be pardoned and released." Instead, the men were given a lethal injection and gunshot wounds to make them appear to have been killed in action during a fake attack. These incidents (particularly the staged attack on the Gleiwitz radio station) were then used in Nazi propaganda to justify the invasion of Poland, the opening event of World War II.

Thereafter, Müller continued to rise quickly through the ranks of the SS. In October 1939 he became an SS-Oberführer, in November 1941 – Gruppenführer and Lieutenant General of the police. During the Second World War, Müller was heavily involved in espionage and counter-espionage, particularly since the Nazi regime increasingly distrusted the military intelligence service—the Abwehr—which under Admiral Wilhelm Canaris was a hotbed of activity for the German Resistance. In 1942 he successfully infiltrated the "Red Orchestra" network of Soviet spies and used it to feed false information to the Soviet intelligence services.

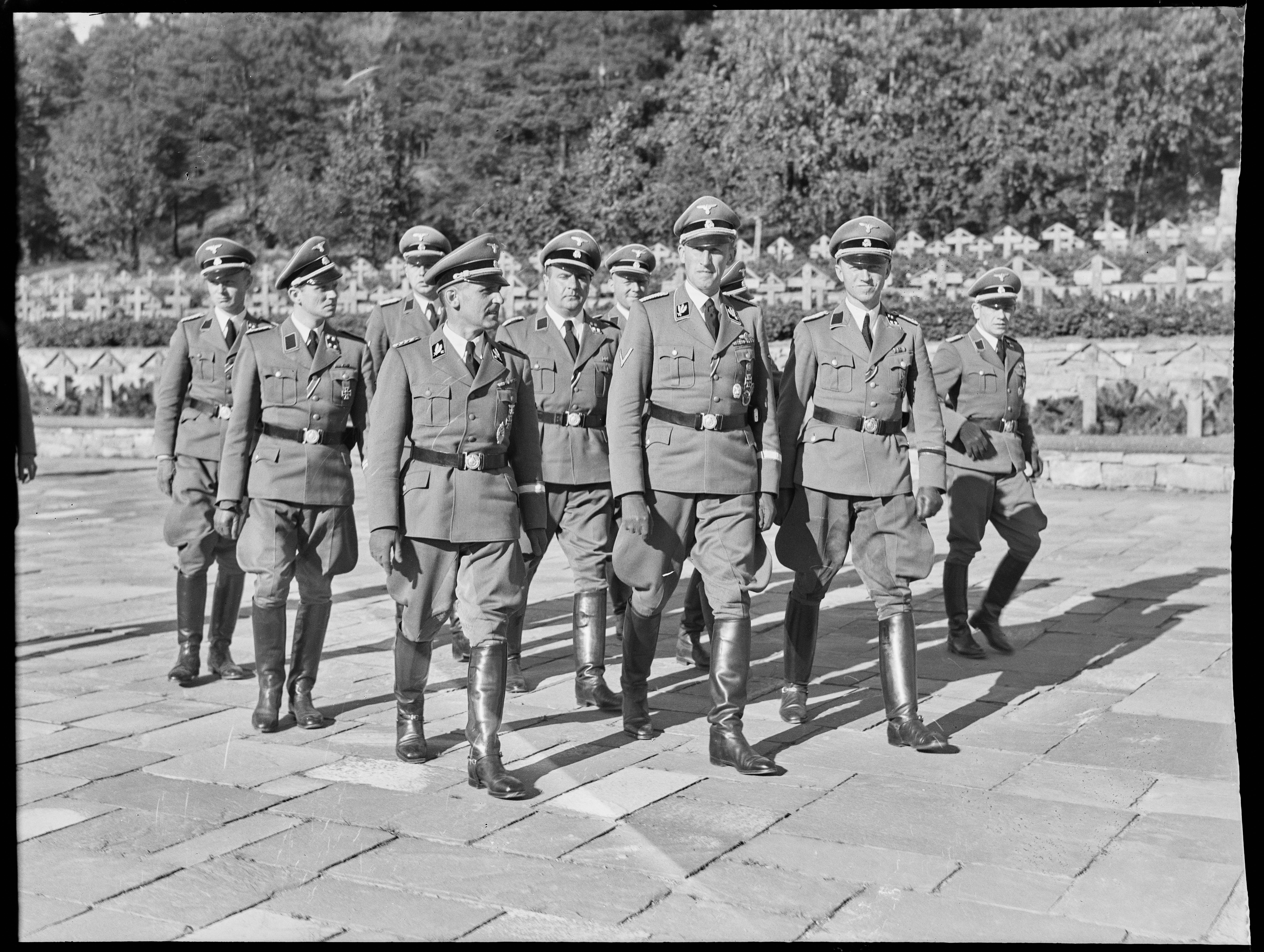
Müller (front row, to the left) and Reinhard Heydrich visiting a war cemetery in Oslo, Norway in 1941.

Heydrich was Müller's direct superior until his assassination in 1942. For the remainder of the war, Ernst Kaltenbrunner took over as Müller's superior. Müller occupied a position in the Nazi hierarchy close to Himmler, the overall head of the Nazi police apparatus and the chief architect of the plan to exterminate the Jews of Europe, and Eichmann, the man entrusted with arranging the deportations of Jews to the Eastern ghettoes and death camps. Eichmann headed the Gestapo's "Office of Resettlement", and then its "Office of Jewish Affairs" (the RSHA Amt IV sub-office known as Referat IV B4). He was Müller's subordinate. Müller was also involved in the regime's policy towards the Jews, although Himmler and Propaganda Minister Joseph Goebbels drove this area of policy. On 6 October 1939 for instance, Müller instructed Eichmann to prepare for the deportation of some 70,000 to 80,000 Jews from the annexed Polish city of Kattowitz; an order which included the deportation of the Jews from Ostrava—both "expulsion campaigns" had already been planned as early as September by the Gestapo or the army. Twelve days later on 18 October 1939, he told Eichmann it would soon "be necessary to organize the resettlement and removal of Poles and Jews into the area of the future Polish rump state centrally" via the RSHA.

Although his chief responsibility was always police work within Germany, he was fully in charge and thus responsible to execute the extermination of the Jews of Europe. When Eichmann reported to Müller sometime in the middle of 1941 that he had been informed by Himmler the Führer had ordered the physical destruction of the Jews for instance, Müller silently nodded at his desk, indicating to Eichmann that he already knew. Correspondingly, Müller received detailed reports from Eichmann about the Einsatzgruppen death-squad units, which according to historian Raul Hilberg killed more than two million people, including 1.3 million Jews between 1941 and 1945. At the end of June 1941, Müller dispatched Eichmann to Minsk, so he could collect detailed information on the execution activities. In August 1941, Müller ordered these killing reports be forwarded to Hitler. Attempting to keep the brutality of the wholesale slaughter occurring in the East as quiet as possible, Müller sent a telegram to the Einsatzgruppen towards the end of August 1941, which explicitly instructed them "to prevent the crowding of spectators during the mass executions." On 23 October 1941, Müller briefed a circular to SiPo stations which exclusively prohibited any future Jewish emigration out of German controlled territory, a directive which presaged their imminent extermination.

In January 1942, he attended the Wannsee Conference at which Heydrich briefed senior officials from a number of government departments of the extermination plan, and at which Eichmann took the minutes. Once the conference concluded, Müller, Heydrich, and Eichmann remained afterwards for additional "informal chats". (Note: There are also reports that afterwards the three of them enjoyed "a glass or two or three of cognac.") Just a couple of months later in March 1942, Jews were already being systematically killed in gas vans at Chelmno and Belzec while construction was underway at Birkenau and Sobibor. Again, Müller sent Eichmann to relate his findings about the killing operations taking place at Chelmno; when Eichmann returned this time, he reported to Müller that the scene was "horrible" and added it was "an indescribable inferno." When the first denunciations of the mass murder being carried-out by the Germans hit the Allied press during the autumn and winter of 1942, Himmler instructed Müller to ensure "all the bodies were either buried or burned."

Enforcement and administration of Nazi "racial-hygiene" policies were also within the purview of Müller's responsibilities, as a special letter he sent from Berlin to all Gestapo offices on 10 March 1942 reveals; the letter contained instructions concerning the relationship between German women and Polish civilians or prisoners of war who were conscripted as labor during the war, particularly in cases related to pregnancy. If both parties proved "racially acceptable" and the Polish man wanted to marry the woman, the pregnancy and relationship was allowed without punitive consequences, provided the RSHA approved after photographic evaluation of both parties and subsequent "Germanization" of the Pole occurred. For cases where one or more parties was deemed racially unfit, the Polish male would receive "special handling", an obvious Nazi euphemism for a death-sentence.

In May 1942, Heydrich was assassinated in Prague by Czechoslovak soldiers sent from London. Müller was sent to Prague to head the investigation into Operation Anthropoid. He succeeded through a combination of bribery and torture in locating the assassins, who killed themselves to avoid capture. Despite this success, his influence within the regime declined somewhat with the loss of his original patron, Heydrich. Nonetheless, between the time Heydrich died in 1942 and Kaltenbrunner took office in January 1943, "Müller played a central role in the organization of The Holocaust." (Note: Historian Klaus Fischer refers to Müller as a "key figure in the Final Solution to the Jewish Question.") (Note: Historian George C. Browder avows that in spite of his humble origins as a police official, Müller "went on to become a chief executive of genocide and every extreme of inhumanity, without displaying any pleasure or lust for blood.") Evidence of Müller's intimate involvement in the Holocaust are abundant in some of the surviving documents and in the later testimony of Eichmann, who divulged that he remained in constant contact with Müller. Eichmann recalled how Müller reserved power unto himself and while he (Eichmann), arranged plenty of deportations, it was only Müller who could write the total number of Jews (in his orange-colored pencil) who were transported at the top of the corresponding reports. (Note: According to Eichmann, Müller conducted weekly meeting with his "specialists" on Thursdays where they would frequently discuss "business" along with personal affairs. Chess games were a routine part of these meetings with Eichmann reporting that Müller always won.)

As the Red Army counteroffensive against the Germans arrayed at the Battle of Stalingrad in mid-November 1942 started to take its toll, the exigencies of war demanded an increase in arms production; Müller played his part by responding to and facilitating Himmler's request for an additional 35,000–40,000 forced laborers. The Gestapo Chief rounded them up from across detention centers and prisons which were not yet part of the concentration camp system and sent them to Majdanek and Auschwitz. Sometime in 1943, Müller was sent to Rome to pressure Fascist Italy to cooperate in relinquishing their Jews for deportation. Despite having the apparent support of Benito Mussolini, Müller's efforts were not very successful as influential Jewish figures within Italy were in contact with the police and the military; they successfully appealed to their (Italians and Jews) shared religious convictions and convinced them to resist Nazi pressure. In 1943 Müller had differences with Himmler over what to do with the growing evidence of a resistance network within the German state apparatus, particularly the Abwehr and the Foreign Office. He presented Himmler with firm evidence during February 1943, that Wilhelm Canaris was involved with the resistance; however, Himmler told him to drop the case. Offended by this, Müller became an ally of Martin Bormann, the head of the Nazi Party Chancellery, who was Himmler's main rival.

According to the SiPo and SD official in Denmark, Rudolf Mildner, Gestapo Chief Müller instructed him "to arrest the Nobel Prize–winning atomic physicist Niels Bohr" sometime in late 1943; this was likely the consequence of Bohr being half-Jewish, but his scientific significance also interested officials in Berlin. Fortunately for Bohr, he was tipped off by a sympathetic German woman working for the Gestapo and was able to escape across the Kattegat Strait into Sweden with the evacuation of Jews from Denmark. Later, Mildner conveniently asserted during Allied questioning that he had disobeyed Müller's order and allowed Bohr to get to safety.

Early in 1944, Müller issued the Nazi injunction known as the "cartridge directive"; this command ordered that Soviet prisoners-of-war who had assisted in the identification of detained political commissars for the purpose of their liquidation be executed on the grounds they were Geheimnisträger (bearers of secrets). Instructions like these amid the numerous other crimes committed at his command made Müller "one of the most feared officials in Europe" during the Nazi reign.

After the attempted assassination of Hitler on 20 July 1944, Müller was placed in charge of the arrest and interrogation of all those suspected of involvement in the resistance. Over 5,000 people were arrested and about 200 executed, including Canaris. Not long after the anti-Nazi resisters were killed, Müller allegedly exclaimed, "We won't make the same mistake as in 1918. We won't leave our internal German enemies alive." In the last months of the war, Müller remained at his post, apparently still confident of a German victory: he told one of his officers in December 1944 that the Ardennes offensive would result in the recapture of Paris.

== Berlin 1945 ==
In April 1945, Müller was among the last of the Nazi loyalists assembled in the Reich Chancellery complex as the Red Army fought its way into the centre of Berlin. According to RSHA official Friedrich Wilhelm Heinrich Malz, Müller was among the many Gestapo officials ordered to aid in the defense of Berlin by Himmler and was almost certainly killed since he had been in the Reich Chancellery from about 23 April. Both Kurt Pomme (Reinhard Heydrich's adjutant) and Horst Kopkow avowed in November 1945 that Müller died when the Russians made their way into Berlin.

One of Müller's last tasks was the interrogation of Hermann Fegelein, Himmler's SS liaison officer, in the cellar of the Church of the Trinity after Himmler's attempted peace negotiations with the Western Allies behind Hitler's back. Fegelein was shot after Hitler expelled Himmler from all his posts. Hitler's secretary Traudl Junge stated that she first saw Müller on 22 April; having assumed Kaltenbrunner's duties as RSHA head, he stayed in the Führerbunker until Hitler's death, sometimes meeting with the dictator. Oberscharführer Rochus Misch, the telephone operator for the Führerbunker, recalled seeing Müller on the afternoon of 30 April, shortly before Hitler committed suicide.

=== Disappearance ===
According to some witnesses, Müller was last seen at the Reich Chancellery on the evening of 1 May 1945. According to Hitler's pilot Hans Baur, Müller stated of his intention not to break out: "We know the Russian methods exactly. I haven't the faintest intention of being taken prisoner by the Russians." From that day onward, no trace of Müller has ever been found. He is the most senior member of the Nazi government whose fate remains a mystery. Author and former British intelligence officer Adrian Weale claims that the evidence about Müller suggests that he was killed or committed suicide during the chaotic fall of Berlin, but his body was never identified. Despite not having confirmed Müller's demise, Berlin issued a death certificate for him dated 15 December 1945, listing his cause of death as "killed in action".

The United States Central Intelligence Agency's (CIA) file on Müller was released under the Freedom of Information Act in 2001 and documents several unsuccessful attempts by U.S. agencies to find him. The U.S. National Archives commentary on the file concludes: "Though inconclusive on Müller's ultimate fate, the file is very clear on one point. The Central Intelligence Agency and its predecessors did not know Müller's whereabouts at any point after the war. In other words, the CIA was never in contact with Müller." The CIA file shows an extensive search, led by the counterespionage branch of the U.S. Office of Strategic Services (forerunner of the CIA), was made for Müller in the months after Germany's surrender. The search was complicated by the fact that "Heinrich Müller" is a very common German name. A further problem arose because "some of these Müllers, including Gestapo Müller, did not appear to have middle names. An additional source of confusion was that there were two different SS generals named Heinrich Müller".

In 1947, American and British agents searched the home of Müller's wartime mistress, Anna Schmid, but found nothing suggesting that he was still alive. With the onset of the Cold War and the shift of priorities to meeting the challenge of the USSR, interest in pursuing missing Nazis declined. By this time, the conclusion seemed to have been reached that Müller was most likely dead. The Royal Air Force Special Investigation Branch also had an interest in Müller with regard to the Stalag Luft III murders, for which he was presumed to have responsibility given his position in the Gestapo.

In a brief passage in his memoirs, Walter Schellenberg alleged that Müller joined the Communists in 1945. He also wrote that in 1950, an unnamed German officer who had been a prisoner of war in the USSR said he saw Müller in Moscow in 1948 and that he died shortly afterward. The capture and subsequent trial of Adolf Eichmann in 1960 sparked new interest in Müller's whereabouts. Although Eichmann revealed no specific information, he told his Israeli interrogators that he believed that Müller was still alive. The West German office in charge of prosecuting war criminals requested investigation by local police in Bavaria and Berlin. The possibility that Müller was working for the USSR was considered, but no definite information was gained. Müller's family and his former secretary were placed under surveillance by the Allies in case he was corresponding with them.

The West Germans investigated several reports of Müller's body being found and buried in the days after the fall of Berlin. The reports were contradictory, not wholly reliable, and it was not possible to confirm any of them. One such report came from Walter Lüders, a former member of the Volkssturm, who said he had been part of a burial unit which had found the body of an SS general in the Reich Chancellery garden with the identity papers of Heinrich Müller. The body had been buried in a mass grave at the old Jewish Cemetery on Grosse Hamburger Strasse in the Soviet Sector. Since this location was in East Berlin in 1961, the gravesite could not be investigated by West German authorities, nor has there been any attempt to excavate the site since the reunification of Germany.

In 1961, Lieutenant-Colonel Michael Goleniewski, the Deputy Chief of Polish Military Counter Intelligence, defected to the U.S. Goleniewski had worked as an interrogator of captured German officials from 1948 to 1952. He never met Müller, but said he had heard from his Soviet superiors that sometime between 1950 and 1952, the Soviets had "picked up Müller and taken him to Moscow". The CIA tried to track down the men Goleniewski named as having worked with Müller in Moscow but were unable to confirm his story. Israel also continued to pursue Müller: in 1967, two Israeli operatives were caught by West German police attempting to break into the Munich apartment of Müller's wife. (Note: Frischauer, Willi (16 November 1967), "This Man Mueller," Evening Standard, Issue: 44603.)

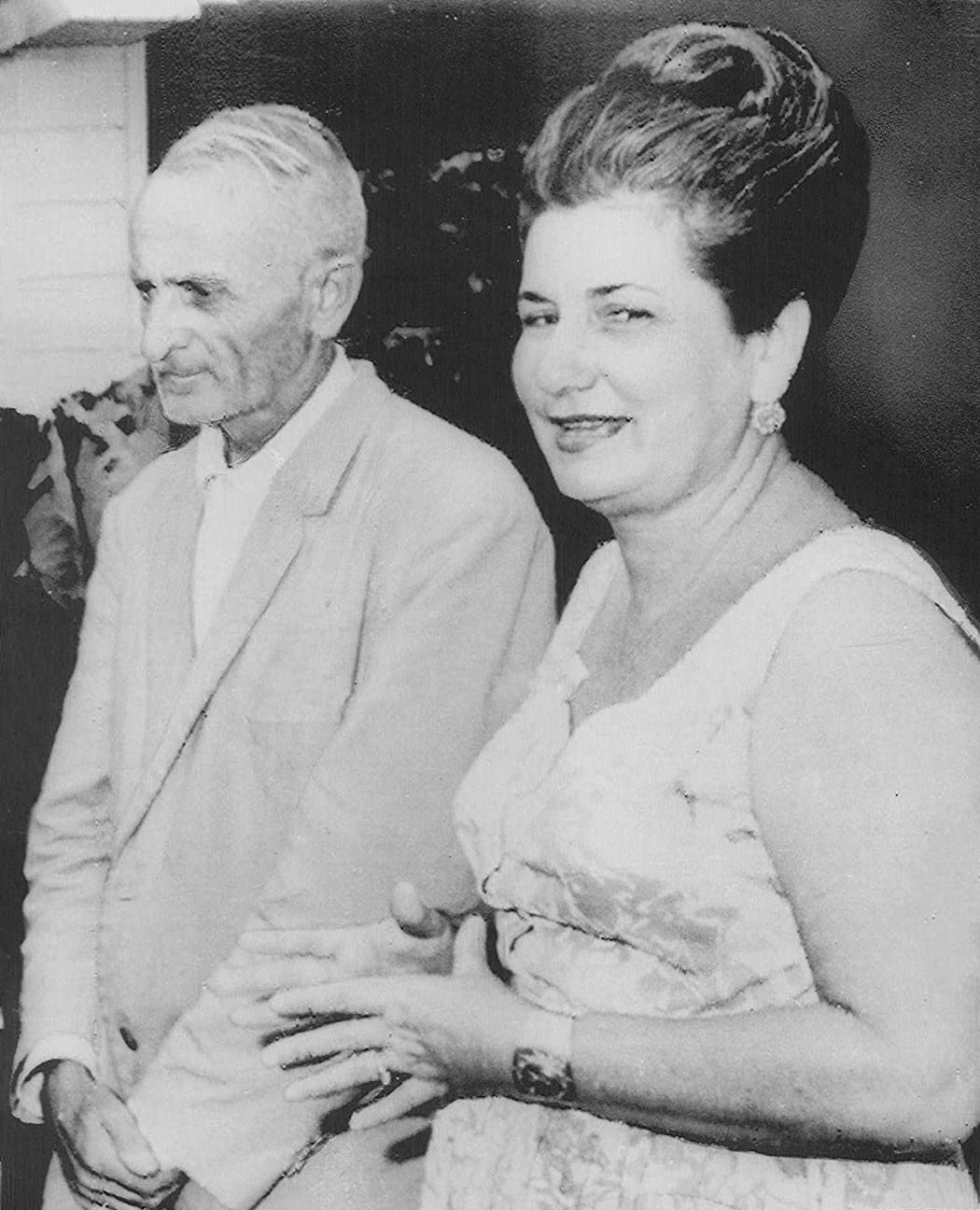
Francis Willard Keith (left) in Panama in 1967

In 1967, after an alleged sighting of Müller in Panama, a man working as an insecticide peddler in Panama City was arrested on suspicions of being Müller. According to his identity papers, he was a Missouri-born man named Francis Willard Keith who had entered Panama with a U.S. passport in 1952. West Germany cited handwriting analysis and visual recognition by his ex-wife, Sophie, from 12 photographs, although she noted that the man had more hair than her husband. West German diplomats pressed Panama to extradite the man, but he was released after the Panamanian police matched his fingerprints to those of a Francis W. Keith who first visited Panama in the early 1940s and worked in the Panama Canal Zone for several months; his account was supported by a diary and a family who said he had lived with them for years. Although the police noted that he had a German accent and spoke little English or Spanish, he defended his identity at a press conference in English, spoken with a U.S. accent. Nazi hunter Simon Wiesenthal, who asserted that Müller had recently lived in South America, doubted that Keith was Müller because the wealth of an escaped Nazi would not require him to peddle goods.

The CIA investigation concluded: "There is little room for doubt that the Soviet and Czechoslovak [intelligence] services circulated rumors to the effect that Müller had escaped to the West ... to offset the charges that the Soviets had sheltered the criminal ... There are strong indications but no proof that Müller collaborated with [the Soviets]. There are also strong indications but no proof that Müller died [in Berlin]." The CIA apparently remained convinced at that time that if Müller had survived the war, he was being harboured within the USSR. However, when the USSR collapsed in 1991 and the Soviet archives were opened, no evidence to support this belief emerged. The U.S. National Archives commentary concludes: "More information about Müller's fate might still emerge from still secret files of the former Soviet Union. The CIA file, by itself, does not permit definitive conclusions. Taking into account the currently available records, the authors of this report conclude that Müller most likely died in Berlin in early May 1945."

In 2007, the British MI5 file on Müller was declassified and much like the CIA file it showed that they did not capture nor recruit him, and further, that their post-war investigations could not establish his whereabouts.

In 2008, German historian Peter Longerich published a biography of Himmler—translated into English in 2012—that contained an unsubstantiated account of Müller's last known whereabouts. According to reports from Himmler's adjutant, Werner Grothmann, Müller was with Himmler at Flensburg on 11 May 1945 and accompanied Himmler and other SS officers as they attempted to escape the Allies on foot. Himmler and Müller parted company at Meinstedt, after which Müller was not seen again.

In 2013, Johannes Tuchel, the head of the Memorial to the German Resistance, stated that Müller's body was found in August 1945 by a work crew cleaning up corpses and was one of 3,000 buried in a mass grave on the site of a former Jewish cemetery in Berlin-Mitte. While Tuchel was confident he had solved the mystery, whether Müller is actually there has not been confirmed. Nonetheless, the uncertainty of Müller's ultimate end and/or whereabouts has only served to nourish the "mysterious power" that the Gestapo elicits even to the present.

=== Alleged CIC dossier ===
In July 1988, author Ian Sayer received from an anonymous individual a 427-page document, purported to be a photocopy of a U.S. Army Counterintelligence Corps (CIC) file that had been inadvertently released by the U.S. National Archives. The dossier alleged that Heinrich Müller had survived the war and had worked for the CIC as an intelligence adviser. It further asserts that Müller claimed that Hitler's death was faked using a body double.

Sayer and co-author Douglas Botting were working on a comprehensive history of the CIC at that time. The dossier had also come to the attention of the U.S. Department of Justice's Nazi-hunting unit, the Office of Special Investigations, who subsequently sought Sayer's opinion on the veracity of the documents. By this time the anonymous individual (later identified as "Gregory Douglas") had managed to interest Time magazine and The Times newspaper in his story. Historian Richard Evans delved into the matter and uncovered that "Gregory Douglas" was a false name used by Peter Stahl, who had far-right connections. He was a known fringe conspiracy theory author who also dealt in Nazi memorabilia; much of which was fake. Historians such as Anton Joachimsthaler and Luke Daly-Groves regard the dossier, particularly its fringe claims about Hitler's death, as examples of concocted "myths".

== See also ==
- Glossary of Nazi Germany
- List of Nazi Party leaders and officials
- List of fugitives from justice who disappeared
- List of SS personnel

== Bibliography ==
- Bauer, Yehuda (1982). A History of the Holocaust. New York: Franklin Watts. ISBN 0-531-09862-1.
- Beevor, Antony (2002). Berlin: The Downfall 1945. London: Viking-Penguin Books. ISBN 978-0-670-03041-5.
- Bessel, Richard (2006). Nazism and War. New York: Modern Library. ISBN 978-0-8129-7557-4.
- Breitman, Richard; Goda, Norman J.W.; Brown, Paul (2005). "The Gestapo". In Richard Breitman; Norman J.W. Goda; Timothy Naftali; Robert Wolfe (eds.). U.S. Intelligence and the Nazis. Cambridge and New York: Cambridge University Press. pp. 137–172. ISBN 978-0-52161-794-9.
- Breitman, Richard; Goda, Norman J.W. (2010). Hitler's Shadow: Nazi War Criminals, U.S. Intelligence, and the Cold War. Washington D.C.: National Archives and Records Administration. ASIN B017POD60E.
- Browder, George C (1996). Hitler's Enforcers: The Gestapo and the SS Security Service in the Nazi Revolution. Oxford and New York: Oxford University Press. ISBN 978-0-19-820297-4.
- Brown, Stephen (2013). "Mystery of Gestapo chief's fate is 'solved', shocking German Jews". Reuters.
- Burleigh, Michael (2000). The Third Reich: A New History. New York: Hill and Wang. ISBN 978-0-8090-9325-0.
- Crankshaw, Edward (2002) [1956]. Gestapo: Instrument of Tyranny. Mechanicsburg, PA: Greenhill Books. ISBN 978-1-85367-481-5.
- Daly-Groves, Luke (2019). Hitler's Death: The Case Against Conspiracy. Oxford, UK: Osprey. ISBN 978-1-4728-3454-6.
- Dams, Carsten; Stolle, Michael (2014). The Gestapo: Power and Terror in the Third Reich. Oxford and New York: Oxford University Press. ISBN 978-0-19-966921-9.
- Dawidowicz, Lucy S. (1975). The War against the Jews: 1933–1945. New York: Holt, Rinehart and Winston. ISBN 0-03-013661-X.
- Dederichs, Mario R. (2009). Heydrich: The Face of Evil. Newbury: Greenhill Books. ISBN 978-1-85367-803-5.
- Delarue, Jacques (2008). The Gestapo: A History of Horror. New York: Skyhorse. ISBN 978-1-60239-246-5.
- Evans, Richard J. (2008). The Third Reich at War. New York: Penguin. ISBN 978-1-59420-206-3.
- Evans, Richard (2020). The Hitler Conspiracies. London: Oxford University Press. ISBN 978-0190083052.
- Fischer, Klaus (1995). Nazi Germany: A New History. New York: Continuum. ISBN 978-0-8264-0797-9.
- Friedländer, Saul (2009). Nazi Germany and the Jews, 1933–1945. New York: Harper Perennial. ISBN 978-0-06-135027-6.
- Fritz, Stephen G. (2011). Ostkrieg: Hitler's War of Extermination in the East. Lexington: The University Press of Kentucky. ISBN 978-0-8131-3416-1.
- Gellately, Robert (1992). The Gestapo and German Society: Enforcing Racial Policy, 1933–1945. Oxford and New York: Oxford University Press. ISBN 978-0-19-820297-4.
- Gerwarth, Robert (2011). Hitler's Hangman: The Life of Heydrich. New Haven, CT: Yale University Press. ISBN 978-0-300-11575-8.
- Gilbert, Martin (1985). The Holocaust: A History of the Jews of Europe during the Second World War. New York: Henry Holt and Company. ISBN 0-8050-0348-7.
- Gorishek, William M. (16 November 1967). "Panama Detective Doubts It: Nazi Mueller Found?". Desert Sun. Vol. 41, no. 89. UCR: Center for Bibliographical Studies and Research.
- Graber, G. S. (1978). The History of the SS. New York: D. McKay. ISBN 0-679-50754-X.
- Grunberger, Richard (1993). Hitler's SS. New York: Dorset Press. ISBN 978-1-56619-152-4.
- Hilberg, Raul (1985). The Destruction of the European Jews. New York: Holmes & Meier. ISBN 0-8419-0910-5.
- Joachimsthaler, Anton (1999) [1995]. The Last Days of Hitler: The Legends, the Evidence, the Truth. Trans. Helmut Bögler. London: Brockhampton Press. ISBN 978-1-86019-902-8.
- Krausnick, Helmut (1968). "The Persecution of the Jews". In Krausnick, Helmut; Buchheim, Hans; Broszat, Martin; Jacobsen, Hans-Adolf (eds.). Anatomy of the SS State. New York: Walker and Company. ISBN 978-0-00-211026-6.
- Laqueur, Walter; Baumel, Judith Tydor (2001). The Holocaust Encyclopedia. New Haven and London: Yale University Press. ISBN 978-0-300-08432-0.
- Longerich, Peter (2010). Holocaust: The Nazi Persecution and Murder of the Jews. Oxford; New York: Oxford University Press. ISBN 978-0-19-280436-5.
- Longerich, Peter (2012). Heinrich Himmler: A Life. Oxford University Press. ISBN 978-0-19-959232-6.
- Manchester Evening Herald (17 November 1967). "Police Sure that Peddler Not Mueller" (PDF). Manchester Evening Herald. pp. 1, 3.
- Mayer, Arno (2012). Why Did the Heavens Not Darken?: The "Final Solution" in History. New York: Verso Publishing. ISBN 978-1-84467-777-1.
- Mazower, Mark (2008). Hitler's Empire: How the Nazis Ruled Europe. New York; Toronto: Penguin. ISBN 978-1-59420-188-2.
- McDonough, Frank (2017). The Gestapo: The Myth and Reality of Hitler's Secret Police. New York: Skyhorse Publishing. ISBN 978-1-51071-465-6.
- Misch, Rochus (2014) [2008]. Hitler's Last Witness: The Memoirs of Hitler's Bodyguard. London: Frontline Books-Skyhorse Publishing, Inc. ISBN 978-1-84832-749-8.
- Naftali, Timothy; Goda, Norman J. W.; Brietman, Richard; Wolfe, Robert (2016). "RG 263 Detailed Report, Heinrich Mueller". U.S. National Archives and Records Administration.
- New York Times (17 November 1967). "Panama Says Suspect Is Not Nazi". The New York Times. ISSN 0362-4331.
- Noakes, Jeremy; Pridham, Geoffrey (1983). Nazism, 1919–1945 (Volume 2) State, Economy, and Society, 1933–38: A Documentary Reader. Exeter: University of Exeter. ISBN 0-85989-174-7.
- Padfield, Peter (1990). Himmler: Reichsfuhrer-SS. New York: Henry Holt and Company. ISBN 0-8050-1476-4.
- Parrish, Thomas; Marshall, S.L.A.., eds. (1978). The Simon and Schuster Encyclopedia of World War II. New York: Simon & Schuster. ISBN 0-671-24277-6.
- Rhodes, Richard (2002). Masters of Death: The SS-Einsatzgruppen and the Invention of the Holocaust. New York: Vintage Books. ISBN 0-375-70822-7.
- The Royal Gazette (17 November 1967). "Capture of top Nazi Proves False". The Royal Gazette. p. 1.
- Sayer, Ian; Botting, Douglas (1989). America's Secret Army- The Untold Story of The (U S Army's) Counter Intelligence Corps. New York: Franklin Watts. ISBN 978-0-53-115097-9.
- Schellenberg, Walter (1956). The Schellenberg Memoirs. Translated by Louis Hagen. New York: André Deutsch. ASIN B0012NS1H8.
- Seeger, Andreas (1996). Gestapo-Müller: Die Karriere eines Schreibtischtäters (in German). Berlin: Metropol Verlag. ISBN 978-3-926893-28-4.
- Shirer, William (1990). The Rise and Fall of the Third Reich. New York: MJF Books. ISBN 978-1-56731-163-1.
- Smale, Alison (2013). "Müller, an Architect of the Holocaust, Is Said to Be Buried in a Jewish Cemetery in Berlin". The New York Times.
- Stackelberg, Roderick (2007). The Routledge Companion to Nazi Germany. New York: Routledge. ISBN 978-0-415-30861-8.
- Weale, Adrian (2010). The SS: A New History. London: Little, Brown. ISBN 978-1-4087-0304-5.
- Whiting, Charles (2001). The Search for Gestapo Müller. Barnsley: Pen & Sword Books. ISBN 978-0-85-052774-2.
- Wistrich, Robert (1995). Who's Who in Nazi Germany. New York: Routledge. ISBN 978-0-415-11888-0.
- Zentner, Christian; Bedürftig, Friedemann (1997) [1991]. The Encyclopedia of The Third Reich. New York: Da Capo Press. ISBN 978-0-306-80793-0.
