= Kelly's Heroes =

1970 film by Brian G. Hutton

- Theatrical release poster by Jack Davis
- Directed by: Brian G. Hutton
- Written by: Troy Kennedy Martin
- Produced by: Gabriel Katzka; Sidney Beckerman
- Starring: Clint Eastwood; Telly Savalas; Don Rickles; Carroll O'Connor; Donald Sutherland
- Cinematography: Gabriel Figueroa
- Edited by: John Jympson
- Music by: Lalo Schifrin
- Production companies: Katzka-Loeb Productions; Avala Film; The Warriors Company
- Distributed by: Metro-Goldwyn-Mayer
- Release date: June 23, 1970 (US)
- Running time: 146 minutes
- Countries: United States; Yugoslavia
- Language: English
- Budget: $4 million
- Box office: $10.2 million (American collection and American re-release collection) and $6 million (Yugoslavia collection) $12 million (Overseas collection) (rentals)

Kelly's Heroes is a 1970 American war comedy drama film directed by Brian G. Hutton and written by Troy Kennedy Martin. Set in 1944, during World War II, it follows a group of disillusioned American soldiers who discover a cache of 14,000 gold bars worth approximately $16 million hidden behind enemy lines and embark on an unsanctioned mission to steal it for themselves. The ensemble cast includes Clint Eastwood, Telly Savalas, Don Rickles, Carroll O'Connor and Donald Sutherland, with supporting performances from Harry Dean Stanton, Gavin MacLeod, Karl-Otto Alberty and Stuart Margolin.

The film emerged during a period of growing experimentation within the war genre, with Kennedy Martin's script blending traditional wartime action with heist-film mechanics and contemporary, anti-authoritarian humor. The screenplay underwent revisions that increased its comedic and satirical elements, the screenplay evolved into a satirical, character-driven story that emphasized the absurdities of military bureaucracy and the growing war-weariness among soldiers during the later stages of the war.

Kelly's Heroes was produced as an American–Yugoslav co-production, with principal photography taking place across what is now Croatia and Serbia on a $4 million budget. The Yugoslav Army supplied extensive World War II–era tanks, vehicles, uniforms, and artillery, allowing the production to stage large-scale battle sequences and recreate the European theater with a degree of realism uncommon for war comedies of the period. The combination of American studio backing and Yugoslav military resources contributed to the film's ambitious scale and visual identity.

Released on June 23, 1970, Kelly's Heroes gained lasting popularity through television broadcasts and home-media releases, becoming known for its off-beat tone, eclectic cast, and mixture of action, satire, and ensemble comedy. In the decades since its release, it has developed a reputation as a unique hybrid of war film and caper movie.

== Plot ==
In 1944 France, during World War II, United States Army Private Kelly—a former lieutenant scapegoated for a failed infantry assault—captures Colonel Dankhopf of Wehrmacht Intelligence. Kelly realizes that Dankhopf is carrying several gold bars and after getting him drunk, learns that they are from a cache of 14,000 gold bars worth $16 million, (Note: The $16 million worth of gold in 1944 is equivalent to $290 million in 2025) stored in a bank 30 miles (50 km) behind German lines in the French town of Clermont. Dankhopf is then killed when the Germans overrun the American line.

Kelly tries to recruit his master sergeant, "Big Joe", into a plot to steal the gold. Big Joe refuses to risk his men's lives for money and warns Kelly against telling them of his plan. Kelly then recruits scheming Supply Sergeant "Crapgame" to provide the needed weapons and supplies. Eccentric hippy tank commander "Oddball" overhears and offers to join the caper with his three unattached M4 Sherman tanks. Finally, Kelly broaches his plan to Big Joe's platoon, who—disillusioned with the pointless battles, being bombed by their own side, and risking death daily for little—eagerly join him. After much arguing, Big Joe agrees to go along.

Kelly's men fight their way through the German lines. However, the bridge needed for Oddball's tanks to rendezvous with them is destroyed by Allied fighter-bombers. Oddball contacts an engineering unit to build a replacement bridge, and the engineers, in turn, bring in even more men to supply support.

Proceeding on foot after their jeeps and half-tracks are destroyed by Allied fighter-bombers who mistake them for German forces, Kelly and his men walk into a minefield and one man is killed. They are forced to probe their way out with bayonets, but a German patrol arrives before the last two men can extricate themselves. The bulk of Kelly's men ambush the German patrol, but to Joe's dismay, the Germans kill the trapped men before being defeated.

Oddball's tanks rendezvous with Kelly two nights later, along with the extra troops he recruited. Kelly and Oddball's men battle their way to Clermont. Their radio messages are intercepted by Major General Colt, who interprets them as efforts by an aggressive unit independently pushing through the previously unmoving battle lines. Colt immediately rushes to exploit this "breakthrough". Kelly's men infiltrate Clermont and eliminate the German infantry, while Oddball's unit destroys two of the three superior Tiger I tanks. When Oddball's last tank breaks down, the men find themselves stalemated, unable to damage the last Tiger or breach the heavily fortified bank.

At Crapgame's suggestion, Kelly, Big Joe, and Oddball talk with the Tiger commander, surmising that he is, like them, a soldier following orders. In exchange for an equal share of the gold, the commander uses the Tiger to destroy the bank's armored doors. The Germans and Oddball's crew depart with their shares, while Kelly's men each receive $875,000 of gold. (Note: Each $875,000 share of gold in 1944 is equivalent to $16 million in 2025) Learning that the still oblivious Colt is on the outskirts of town, Big Joe tells the celebrating townspeople that Colt is French General Charles de Gaulle, and they block his path, allowing Kelly and his men time to escape with the gold.

== Cast ==
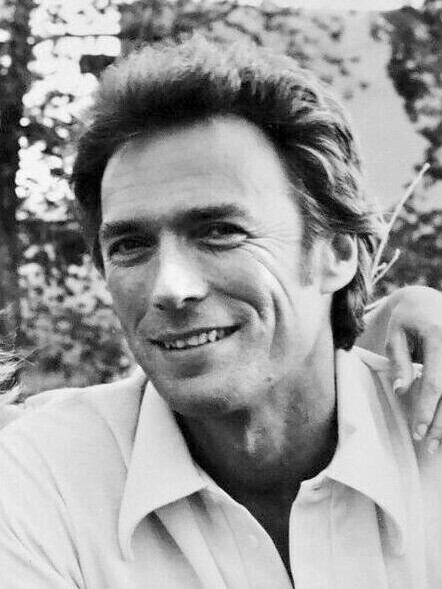
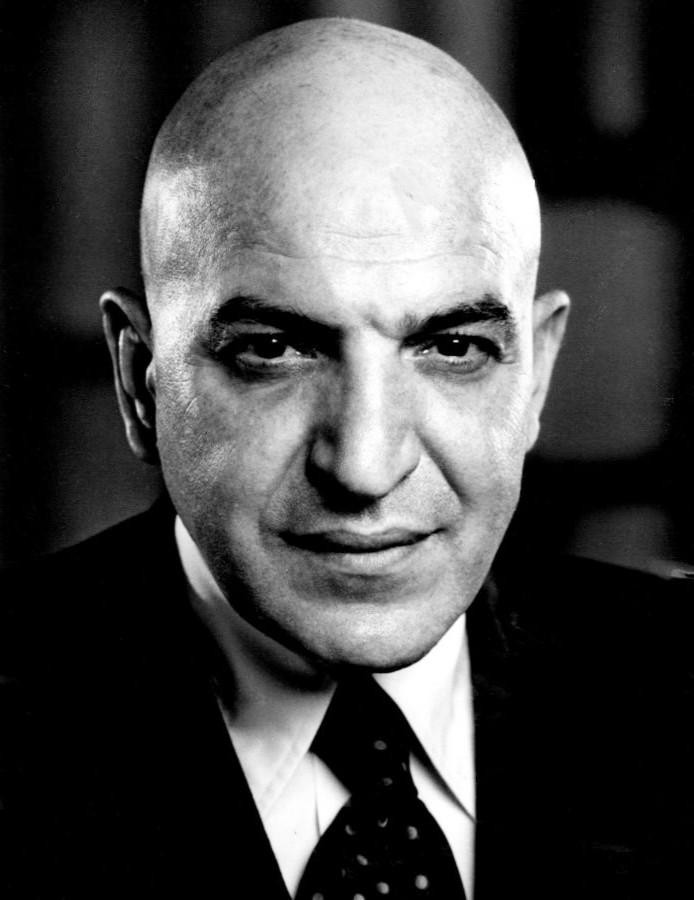
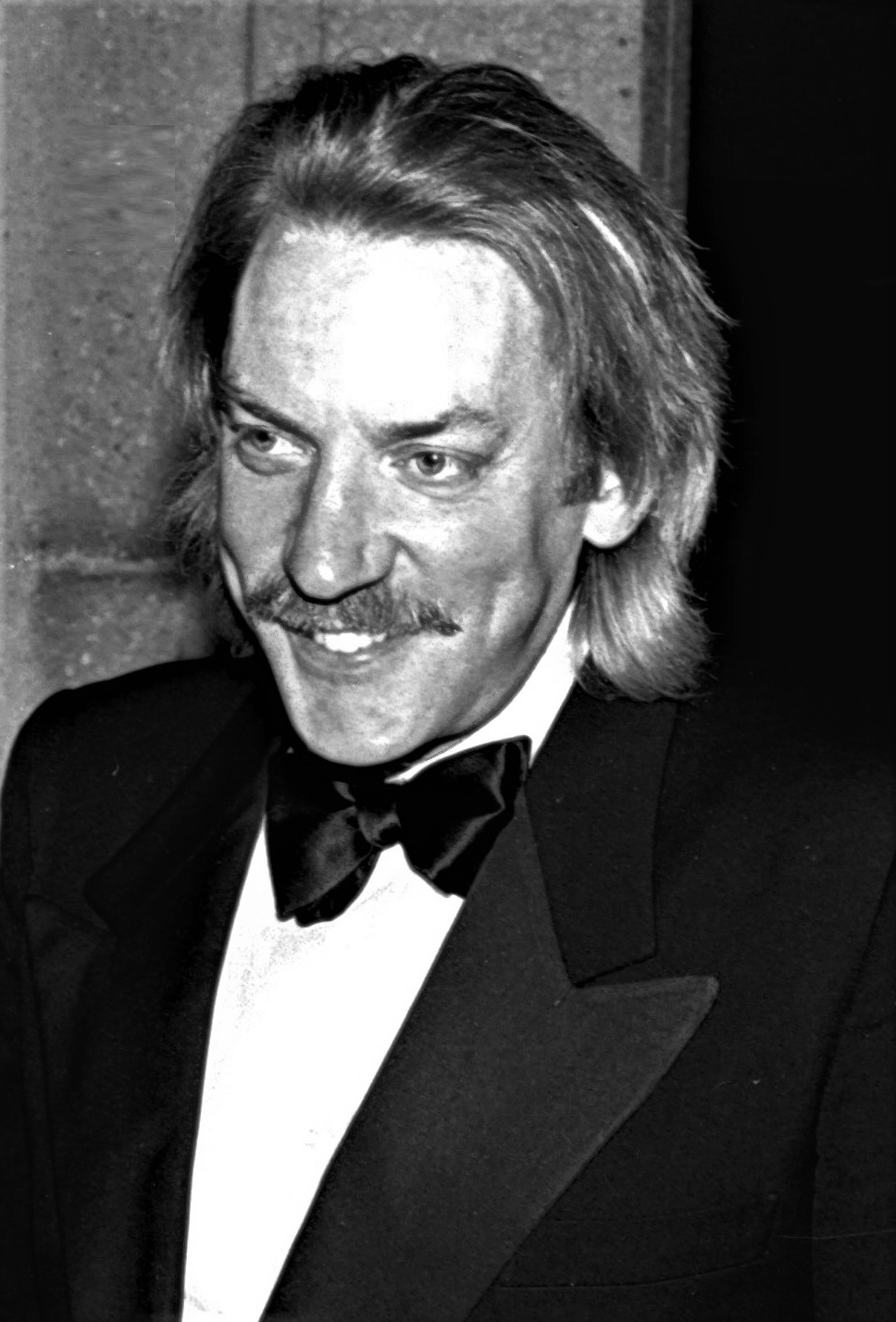
Clint Eastwood (pictured in 1976), Telly Savalas (1973), and Donald Sutherland (1981)
- Clint Eastwood as Private Kelly
- Telly Savalas as Master Sergeant Joe "Big Joe"
- Don Rickles as Staff Sergeant "Crapgame"
- Carroll O'Connor as General Colt
- Donald Sutherland as Sergeant "Oddball"
- Gavin MacLeod as Private Moriarty
- Hal Buckley as Captain Maitland
- Stuart Margolin as Private Joe "Little Joe"
- Jeff Morris as Private First Class "Cowboy"
- Richard Davalos as Private Gutkowski
- Perry Lopez as Private Petuko
- Tom Troupe as Corporal Job
- Harry Dean Stanton as Private Willard
- Dick Balduzzi as Private Fisher
- Gene Collins as Private "Barbara" Babra
- Len Lesser as Sergeant Bellamy
- David Hurst as Colonel Dankhopf
- Fred Pearlman as Private Mitchell
- Michael Clark as Private Grace
- George Fargo as Private Penn
- Dee Pollock as Private "Jonesy" Jones
- George Savalas as First Sergeant Mulligan
- Karl Otto Alberty as German Tank Commander
- John Heller as German Lieutenant
- Shepherd Sanders as Turk

== Production ==
=== Origins ===
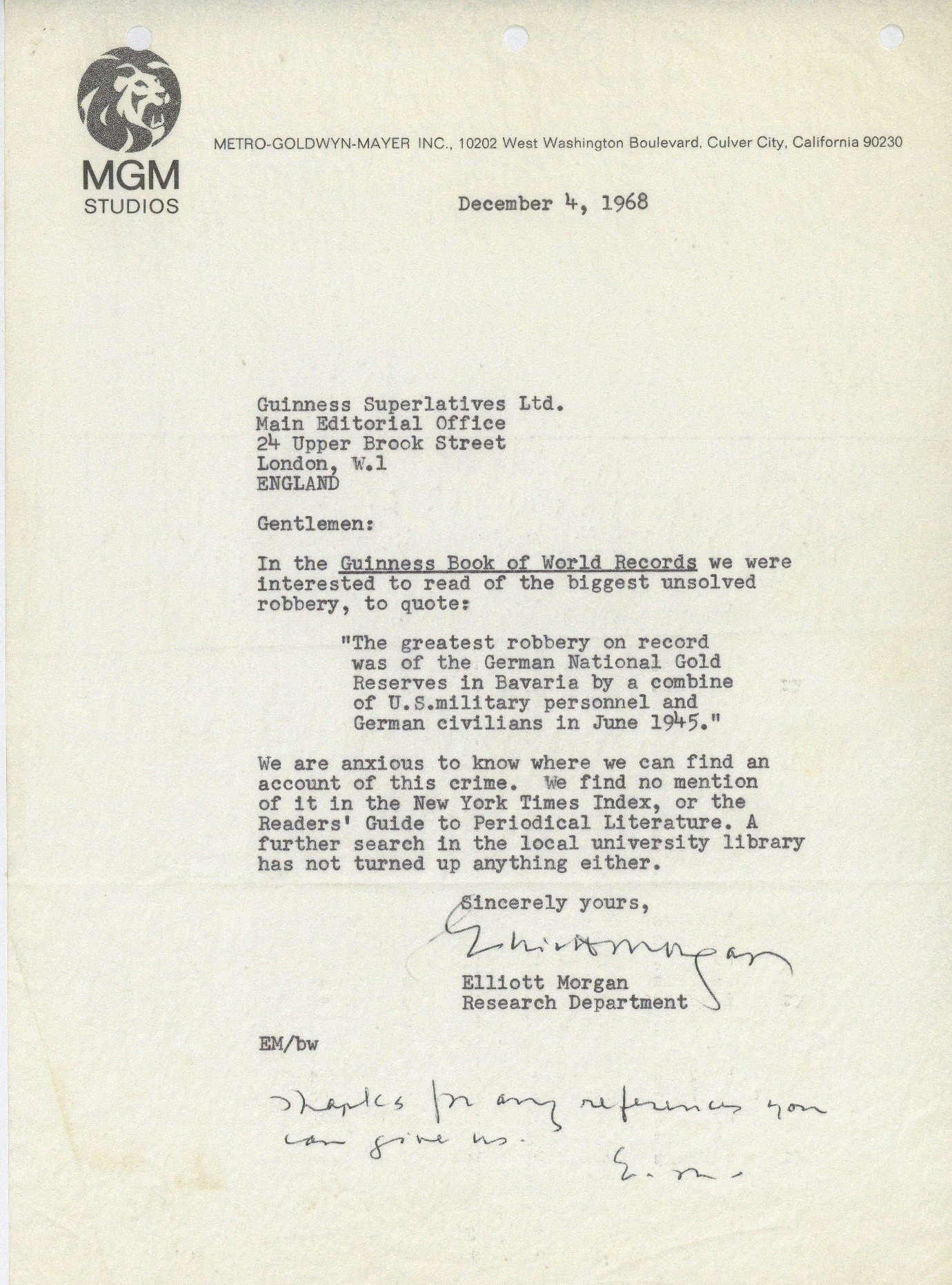
Elliott Morgan's letter to the Guinness Book of World Records: Photo credit: Courtesy of Ian Sayer Archive

The screenplay was written by British film and television writer Troy Kennedy Martin. He relied on a true story, featured as "The Greatest Robbery on Record" in Guinness World Records from 1956 to 2000. On 4 December 1968, Elliott Morgan, head of research for Metro-Goldwyn-Mayer, wrote to the Guinness Book of World Records requesting information on this entry: "The greatest robbery on record was of the German National Gold Reserves in Bavaria by a combine of U.S. military personnel and German civilians in 1945". On 10 December, the editor, Norris D. McWhirter, wrote back to Morgan, stating that he had very little information and that he essentially suspected that a cover-up had occurred, which required that the story should be subject to a "restricted classification". He closed by suggesting that until that security classification was changed, "due to death or eflux [sic] of time, any film made will have to be an historical romance rather than history".

In 1975, British researcher Ian Sayer began a nine-year investigation into the Guinness entry. The results of his investigation, which confirmed a cover-up by the U.S. government together with the involvement of U.S. military and former Wehrmacht and SS officers in the theft, were published in the 1984 book Nazi Gold — The Sensational Story of the World's Greatest Robbery — and the Greatest Criminal Cover-Up. The investigation finally led to two of the missing gold bars (valued in 2019 at over $1 million) being handed over by German officials to the U.S. government in a secret ceremony at Bonn on 27 September 1996. The bullion was transported to the Bank of England, where it was held to the account of the Tripartite Commission for the Restitution of Monetary Gold (TCRMG). The first disclosure that the bank was holding the two bars (complete with Nazi markings) came from a press release issued by the bank on 8 May 1997, which confirmed that the two bars were those that had been identified as missing in the book Nazi Gold. Sayer had given information to the United States Department of State concerning the two bars (among other things) in July 1978. In 1983, they finally agreed to investigate using Sayer's evidence. The State Department investigation did not conclude until 1997. On 11 December 1997, Sayer was invited, by the secretary general of the TCRMG, to view the two bars in the gold bullion vaults of the Bank of England. In addition to being accorded this rare honour, he was also photographed holding the bars, which he had been instrumental in tracking down.

=== Filming ===
In November, 1968, Metro-Goldwyn-Mayer announced the project under the title of The Warriors. Filming commenced in July 1969 and was completed in December. The film was made and released during a period of great financial difficulties for MGM, in the early days of the studio's turbulent ownership by Kirk Kerkorian. It was shot on location in Yugoslavia, in the Istrian village of Vižinada, in the city of Novi Sad, and the ruins of the Beočin palace (in present-day Croatia and Serbia, respectively), and finally in London. One of the reasons for the selection of Yugoslavia as the main location was that, in 1969, it was one of the few nations whose army was still equipped with operating World War II mechanized equipment, both German and American, including in particular the M4 Sherman tank. This simplified the film's logistics tremendously. Actors like Clint Eastwood would spend time at Petrovaradin Fortress in Novi Sad during production. During filming, Donald Sutherland had contracted spinal meningitis, exacerbated by a lack of antibiotics, which caused him to go into a life-threatening coma, but he managed to recover.

During pre-production, George Kennedy turned down the role of Big Joe, despite an offered fee of $300,000 (about $2.6 million in 2025), because he did not like the role. The original script included a female role, which was removed just before filming began. Ingrid Pitt, who had worked on Where Eagles Dare with Eastwood and Brian G. Hutton for MGM the previous year, had been cast in the role. She later said she was "virtually climbing on board the plane bound for Yugoslavia when word came through that my part had been cut". In the film's climax, a nod is given to the ending of The Good, the Bad and the Ugly, another Eastwood film, including a similar musical score and the addition of jangling spurs to the soundtrack.

=== Vehicles and weapons ===
The Tiger I tanks were actually Soviet T-34 tanks that had been modified by Yugoslav military to look like the German tanks. The U.S. Sherman tanks were the rare M4A3E4 variant. Oddball's tank is now part of the military weapons' exposition at the center of Novi Sad. Kelly's platoon also drove an T19 howitzer motor carriage before it was destroyed on the hill, as well as several half-tracks. The Germans also drove a Kübelwagen.

Kelly's men were armed with a mix of .30 caliber machine guns, Browning automatic rifles, and Thompson submachine guns, with few carbines and no M-1 rifles. Gutkowski, the unit's sniper, was armed with a Soviet Mosin–Nagant M91/30 rifle. The German soldiers were armed almost exclusively with MP 40 submachine guns. The U.S. plane that attacked Kelly's group was a Yugoslavian Soko 522 painted with U.S. Army air force roundels.

=== Deleted scenes ===
MGM cut about 20 minutes from the film before its theatrical release. Eastwood later stated in interviews that he was very disappointed about the cuts by MGM because he felt that many of the deleted scenes not only gave depth to the characters, but also made the movie much better. According to Screen Rant, Eastwood felt the cuts turned "one of the best antiwar stories [he'd] ever seen" into "a silly shoot 'em up caper". Some of the deleted scenes were shown on promotional stills and described in interviews with cast and crew for Cinema Retro's special-edition article about Kelly's Heroes:

- Oddball (Sutherland) and his crew pack up to go across the lines to meet with Kelly (Eastwood) and others while local village girls are running around half naked.
- The platoon encounters a group of German soldiers and naked girls swimming in a pool.
- While they wait for Oddball in the barn at night, Kelly and Big Joe (Telly Savalas) talk about their disillusionment with the war and why Kelly was made a scapegoat for the attack that resulted in his demotion. Another part was deleted from this scene, in which the platoon decides they do not want to continue with the mission, and Gutkowski (Richard Davalos) threatens Kelly at gunpoint but Big Joe and Crapgame (Don Rickles) side with Kelly.
- General Colt (Carroll O'Connor) is shown in bed with some women when he gets a call that Kelly and others have broken through the enemy lines.
- During the attack on the town, production designer John Barry had a cameo as a British airman hiding from the Germans.
- One promotional still shows Kelly finding a wounded German soldier among the ruined houses during the final attack on the town.
- Kelly, Oddball and Big Joe discuss tactics while standing on an abandoned Tiger tank before the scene in which they negotiate with the German tank commander.
- When Kelly and the platoon drive off at the end, several soldiers yell at them that they are headed in the wrong direction.

== Musical score and soundtrack ==
Kelly's Heroes

Soundtrack album by Lalo Schifrin
- Released: 1970
- Recorded: April 21 and June, 1970
- Studios: TTG (Hollywood, California)
- Genre: Film score
- Labels: MGM; ISE-23ST
- Producers: Mike Curb and Jesse Kaye

Lalo Schifrin chronology
Che! (1969)	Kelly's Heroes (1970)	Rock Requiem (1971)

The film score was composed, arranged and conducted by Lalo Schifrin, while the soundtrack album was released by MGM Records in 1970. The president of MGM Records, Mike Curb, wrote two songs for the film, with his group, the Mike Curb Congregation, performing on a number of the songs.

The soundtrack was released on LP, as well a subsequent CD featuring the LP tracks, by Chapter III Records; both were mostly re-recordings. An expanded edition of the soundtrack was released by Film Score Monthly in 2005. The main musical theme of the film (at both beginning and end) is "Burning Bridges", sung by the Mike Curb Congregation with music by Schifrin. Also, a casual rendition of the music is heard in the background near the middle of the film. The Mike Curb Congregation's recording of "Burning Bridges" reached number 34 on the Billboard Hot 100 singles chart on March 6, 1971, but it did much better in South Africa, where it was the number-one song on the charts for five weeks ending in November 1970, and in New Zealand, where it spent two weeks at number one in March 1971. It also had a two-week stay at number one in Australia, and in Canada the song reached #23 in March 1971.

Mike Curb wrote the song "All for the Love of Sunshine" for the film, with the Mike Curb Congregation providing background on the recording by Hank Williams, Jr. Its inclusion in the film is sometimes considered to be an anachronism. The song became the first number-one country hit for Williams.

== Reception ==
The film received mostly positive reviews. It was voted at number 34 in Channel 4's 100 Greatest War Films of All Time. The film earned $5.2 million in US theatrical rentals.

Film review aggregator website Rotten Tomatoes gave the film an approval rating of 79% based on 24 reviews, with an average rating of 6.8/10. The website's critical consensus reads: "Kelly's Heroes subverts its World War II setting with pointed satirical commentary on modern military efforts, offering an entertaining hybrid of heist caper and battlefield action".

Roger Greenspun of The New York Times described the action scenes as "good clean scary fun," until it goes "terribly wrong" when many soldiers are killed and "the balance alters to the horrors of war. To acknowledge its deaths, the film has no resources above the conventional antagonistic ironies and comradely pieties of most war movies. And since its subject is not war, but burglary masquerading as war, the easy acceptance of the masquerade—which is apparently quite beyond the film's control—becomes a denial of moral perception that depresses the mind and bewilders the imagination". Arthur D. Murphy of Variety called the film "a very preposterous, very commercial World War II comedy meller, the type which combines roadshow production values and length with B-plot artistry". Gene Siskel of the Chicago Tribune gave the film two-and-a-half stars out of four and wrote that "the bombing becomes tedious. One quickly realizes anytime a large object is brought into focus it will soon be incinerated. With only one dramatic problem—getting the gold—it is hard to imagine how the producers and directors could let the film run nearly two-and-one-half hours". Charles Champlin of the Los Angeles Times called the film "a picture which confuses shrillness with wit and slaughter with slapstick", adding, "Even the estimable Donald Sutherland can't redeem the picture. Despite his artful efforts, his role as a long-haired hippie tank commander is so ludicrously out of time and place that it becomes hard to stomach in a film in which, elsewhere, two GIs trapped in a mine field are gunned down like cans on a stump. You can't poison your cake and eat it too". Alan M. Kriegsman of The Washington Post described the film as "a case of machismo gone mad," and wondered "how a photographer like Gabriel Figueroa, who shot a number of Luis Bunuel's finest films, among other things, ever got roped into such a jejune, tasteless project". The Monthly Film Bulletin stated: "In terms of rip-roaring, bulldozing action, this attempt to cross The Dirty Dozen with Where Eagles Dare can be said to have achieved its object". However, the review went on: "With all energy apparently expended on sustaining over two hours of consistently devastating explosions, pyrotechnics and demolition, little attention has been paid either to period detail (resulting in mini-skirted townswomen and the description of conditions in terms of 'hung-up' and 'freaked out') or to the script, which is jolly, vituperative, and little else".

=== Home media ===
Kelly's Heroes was released on DVD by Warner Home Video on August 1, 2000, in a Region 1 widescreen DVD (one of several solo DVDs marketed as the Clint Eastwood Collection). The film was re-released again on June 1, 2010, this time as a Blu-ray Region A widescreen two-disc set also with Eastwood's 1968 World War II feature film Where Eagles Dare.

== See also ==
- List of American films of 1970
- Les Morfalous, a French 1984 remake of Kelly's Heroes
- Three Kings, a 1999 film with a similar premise, set during the 1991 uprisings in Iraq, but entirely fictional
- Renegades, A 2017 movie about a gold heist in a 1990s conflict
- Escape to Athena (1979)
- Wild Geese II (1985)
- Inside Out (1975)

== Bibliography ==
- Hughes, Howard (2009). Aim for the Heart. London: I. B. Tauris. ISBN 978-1-84511-902-7.
- McGilligan, Patrick (1999). Clint: The Life and Legend. London: HarperCollins. ISBN 0-00-638354-8.
- Munn, Michael (1992). Clint Eastwood: Hollywood's Loner. London: Robson Books. ISBN 0-86051-790-X.
