= The Interrogator (TV play) =

The Interrogator is a 1961 British TV play set during the Cyprus Emergency (1955-1959). It was written by Troy Kennedy Martin who had served in Cyprus and written another play set there, Incident at Echo Six.

== Plot ==
In Cyprus, a British officer interrogates an EOKA terrorist.
