= Troy Kennedy Martin =

British screenwriter

- Born: 15 February 1932; Rothesay, Isle of Bute, Scotland
- Died: 15 September 2009 (aged 77); Ditchling, East Sussex, England
- Occupation: Screenwriter
- Relatives: Ian Kennedy Martin (brother)

Troy Kennedy Martin (15 February 1932 – 15 September 2009) was a Scottish-born film and television screenwriter. He created the long-running BBC TV police series Z-Cars (1962–1978), and the award-winning 1985 anti-nuclear drama Edge of Darkness. He also wrote the screenplay for the original version of The Italian Job (1969). His last film was Ferrari (2023), which was posthumously released.

== Biography ==
=== Early life ===
He was born in Rothesay, Isle of Bute, and educated in Scotland, at Finchley Catholic Grammar School and Trinity College, Dublin, where he studied history and political science. He had a younger brother Ian, who was also a television writer, and best known for creating The Sweeney.

=== 1960s ===
He began writing for BBC Television in 1958, beginning with the play Incident at Echo Six, and he wrote four further plays for the BBC over the following three years, before in 1961 creating his first series, Storyboard, a six-part anthology series that consisted both of original scripts and adaptations. The same year, he wrote the police drama The Interrogator. He wrote an important manifesto about new television drama in 1964, calling for a more mobile style of camera work and less emphasis on dialogue.

In 1962, Martin co-created the drama series Z-Cars. Set in "Newtown", based on Kirkby near Liverpool, Z-Cars was revolutionary in that it depicted a hard-edged, grittier and much more realistic vision of the police force than had been seen on British television – as a result, it was initially very unpopular with the real police. Although he left the programme after the first two series, the series ran until 1978, and he returned to write the final episode.

In 1965, Martin scripted a television adaptation of Frederik Pohl's short story The Midas Plague, which was shown as an episode for the first series of Out of the Unknown, a science-fiction anthology series shown on BBC2. One of the more light-hearted stories of the otherwise dark and dramatic show, it is one of only 20 (and a half) episodes of the original 48 known to have survived destruction, and is available on DVD.

=== 1970s ===
Over the following decade he contributed to various television programmes, and made his first foray into feature films when he wrote The Italian Job, which was released in 1969 and starred Noël Coward and Michael Caine. The following year he wrote Kelly's Heroes, and he scripted two more films during the 1970s – The Jerusalem File (1971) and Sweeney 2 (1978).

Sweeney 2 was the second cinematic spin-off from the television series The Sweeney, which had been created by his brother Ian Kennedy Martin, and for which he had written several episodes. He is less well known for writing a little-seen television sitcom based in the British Civil Service, If It Moves, File It (1970), featuring amongst others John Bird, who later co-starred in the satirical Bremner, Bird and Fortune.

=== 1980s ===
In the early 1980s he was no less successful, with two highly popular series on different networks in 1983. The Old Men at the Zoo was an adaptation of the novel by Angus Wilson and screened on BBC One; the second was the hugely popular Reilly, Ace of Spies on ITV, based on the book by Robin Bruce Lockhart and starring Sam Neill.

Greatly influenced by the political landscape of the early 1980s, he had drafted a script for a political thriller-cum-science fiction drama serial entitled Magnox, which became Edge of Darkness. He was interviewed about the genesis of the series for Magnox: The Secrets of Edge of Darkness documentary, an extra on the show's 2003 DVD release:

We had the Cold War. The Falklands. The Nuclear State. The prospect of a miners' strike. Greenham Common. It was Thatcher's Britain. At the BBC, there was no political dimension in their popular drama whatsoever. And I was really depressed about it, as indeed were other writers that I knew. And so, I said to my closest colleagues: 'The only thing one can do is actually write stuff that one knows is not going to get made, but at least we'll get it out of our system'. And that's how I started to write Edge Of Darkness. I didn't really think that it stood much of a chance of being produced.

The concept attracted little interest from television executives until incoming BBC Head of Drama Series & Serials Jonathan Powell picked it up in 1983, assigning experienced producer Michael Wearing to the project. Edge of Darkness was eventually screened on BBC2 in late 1985. Although Kennedy Martin had many creative differences with director Martin Campbell and star Bob Peck (who is reported to have vetoed the scripted ending with the remark "I'm not turning into a fucking tree!"), the drama was a resounding success, picking up several awards and being remembered as one of the best British television drama productions of the 1980s. Following Edge of Darkness he wrote another feature film screenplay, Red Heat (1988, co-written with director Walter Hill), which starred Arnold Schwarzenegger and James Belushi.

=== 1990s ===
Kennedy Martin did not return to television scriptwriting until the one-off BBC Two drama Hostile Waters in 1997. Other later work included Bravo Two Zero for BBC One in 1999, co-written with Andy McNab and starring Sean Bean.

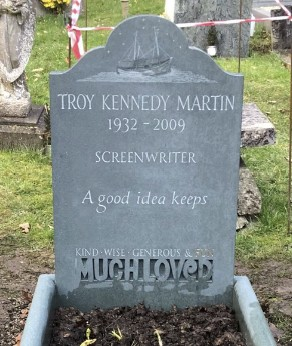
Grave of Troy Kennedy Martin in Highgate Cemetery

=== Death ===
He died of lung cancer on 15 September 2009 aged 77, in Ditchling, East Sussex and was buried on the eastern side of Highgate Cemetery.

== Selected filmography ==
=== Film ===
- The Italian Job (1969)
- Kelly's Heroes (1970)
- The Jerusalem File (1972)
- Sweeney II (1978)
- Red Heat (1988)
- Red Dust (2004)
- Ferrari (2023)

=== Television ===
- Incident at Echo Six (1958)
- The Interrogator (1961)
- Storyboard (1961)
- Z-Cars (1962–78)
- Redcap (1965–66)
- The Sweeney (1975–78)
- Reilly, Ace of Spies (1983)
- Edge of Darkness (1985)
- Hostile Waters (1997)
- Bravo Two Zero (1999)
