= Douglas Botting =

English explorer, writer, TV presenter and producer (1934–2018)

- Born: 22 February 1934; Kingston upon Thames, Surrey, England
- Died: 6 February 2018 (aged 83)
- Education: St Edmund Hall, Oxford
- Occupations: Explorer, author, biographer and TV presenter and producer
- Spouse(s): Louise Botting, m. 1964, diss. mid-1980s
- Children: 2, including Anna Botting

Douglas Scott Botting (22 February 1934 – 6 February 2018) was an English explorer, author, biographer and TV presenter and producer. He wrote biographies of naturalists Gavin Maxwell and Gerald Durrell (the former also being a personal friend). Botting was the inspiration behind and writer of the 1972 film The Black Safari, a role-reversal parody of English explorers, with Africans touring England, shown in the BBC 2 documentary series The World About Us. He also featured in much other BBC programming, including Under London Expedition exploring the London sewerage system, as part of the BBC2 nature series The World About Us. He wrote numerous Second World War and early aviation books for Time Life Books. Botting took part, with Anthony Smith, in the first balloon flight over Africa.

== Biography ==
Botting was born in Kingston upon Thames, Surrey; he lived in and went to school in Worcester Park. Having witnessed the London Blitz first-hand, he went on to make documentaries and write historical records of the Second World War and aviation. Botting got an early flavour of travel when he served as an infantry subaltern for the King's African Rifles in Kenya, as part of his National Service. He went on to study English at St Edmund Hall, Oxford (graduating in 1954), during which time he undertook a pioneering exploration of the little-known island of Socotra in the Indian Ocean. His first book, Island of the Dragon's Blood, is an account of this trip.

During his Oxford and post-Oxford years, he volunteered and worked in a variety of positions, including as a paramilitary ambulance unit member during the 1956 Hungarian Revolution, as a private tutor to the Crown Prince of Nepal, as a worker in a leper colony in Biafra, and as a trainer for ex-head-hunter tribes undergoing re-training in the Venezuelan rainforest.

However, he chose documentary filmmaking, and investigative journalism as his career. As a BBC Special Correspondent to the former USSR, he reported news events such as the first cosmonauts' homecoming and Fidel Castro's state visit, and was the first person from west of the Iron Curtain since the Russian Revolution of 1917 to travel voluntarily among the nomadic reindeer tribes of Arctic Siberia and the Gulag. Botting went on to make documentary films for organisations including National Geographic, the BBC, Time Life and the Royal Geographical Society.

Among his other occupations was that of writing: Botting wrote a series of Time Life Books on the Second World War, early aviation and maritime vessels. His foray into investigative journalism included several other Second World War books, including the best-selling Nazi Gold: The Story of the World's Greatest Robbery - And Its Aftermath. His back-to-back biographies of Gavin Maxwell and Gerald Durrell also earned him praise.

== Explorations ==
Botting was an accomplished explorer in his own right. He undertook a systematic explorations of Socotra while at university, and was part of the world's first balloon journey over Africa, the first British balloon journey across the High Alps, and the first vessel ever to voyage by inland waterways from the Amazon to the Caribbean via the unexplored rain forests of the Casiquiare and Orinoco.

== Personal life ==
Botting married the future broadcaster and company director Louise Young in 1964. The couple had two daughters: Kate, a writer and television producer, and news presenter Anna Botting. The marriage was dissolved in the mid-1980s.

== Bibliography ==
- Island of the Dragon's Blood (illustrated by A. Spark and Janet Chandler); Hodder and Stoughton, 1958
- The Knights of Bornu; Hodder and Stoughton, 1961
- One Chilly Siberian Morning; Hodder and Stoughton, 1965
- Humboldt and the Cosmos; Michael Joseph, 1973
- Shadow in the Clouds: The Story of the Airships; Kestrel Books, 1975; ISBN 0-7226-6803-1
- Wilderness Europe; Time Life Books, 1976; ISBN 0-8094-2062-7
- The Great Cities: Rio De Janeiro; Time Life Books, 1977; ISBN 0-7054-0490-0
- The Pirates of the Spanish Main (illustrated by Gareth Floyd); Time Life Books, 1978; ISBN 0-8094-2652-8
- The Second Front ; Time Life Books, 1978; ISBN 0-8094-2500-9
- The Seafarers: The U-Boats; Time Life Books, 1979; ISBN 0-8094-2675-7
- The Epic of Flight: The Giant Airships; Time Life Books, 1980; ISBN 0-8094-3272-2
- The Aftermath: Europe; Time Life Books, 1983; ISBN 0-8094-3411-3
- Nazi Gold: The Story of the World's Greatest Robbery - And Its Aftermath (co-author Ian Sayer); Granada, 1984; ISBN 0-246-11767-2
- In the Ruins of The Reich: Germany 1945-1949; Allen and Unwin, 1985; ISBN 0-04-943036-X
- Wild Britain: A Traveller's Guide; Ebury Press, 1988
- Wild France: A Traveller's Guide; Ebury Press, 1988
- America's Secret Army: The Untold Story of the Counter Intelligence Corps (co-author Ian Sayer); Grafton Books, 1989; ISBN 0-246-12690-6
- Hitler's Last General: The Case Against Wilheim Mohnke (co-author Ian Sayer); Bantam Books, 1989; ISBN 0-593-01709-9
- Gavin Maxwell: A Life; HarperCollins, 1993; ISBN 0-246-13046-6
- Sex Appeal: The Art and Science of Sexual Attraction (co-author Kate Botting); Boxtree Ltd, 1996; ISBN 0-7522-1611-2
- The D-Day Invasion; Time Life Books, 1998; ISBN 0-7835-5701-9
- Gerald Durrell: The Authorized Biography; HarperCollins, 1999; ISBN 0-00-255660-X
- Dr.Eckener's Dream Machine: The Extraordinary Story of the Zeppelin; HarperCollins, 2001; ISBN 0-00-257191-9
- Hitler and Women: The Love Life of Adolf Hitler (co-author Ian Sayer); Constable and Robinson, 2004; ISBN 1-84119-918-4

NB: In case of country specific first editions, the edition of the author's home country (UK) is chosen.

== Filmography ==
- The Forgotten Island (Socotra) (2-part series BBC TV)
- Festival in Kano (Northern Nigeria) (BBC TV)
- The Surf Boats of Anomabu (Ghana)
- Beauty for Ashes (Uzuakoli Leper Colony, Eastern Nigeria) (Gateway Films/Methodist Mission)
- Kenya Mountain (medical and missionary work in Kenya) (Gateway Films)
- Balloon Safari (Zanzibar) (4-part series BBC TV)
- Maytime in Muscovy (BBC TV)
- Siberia (BBC TV)
- Greville Wynne Spy Trial (Moscow) (BBC TV News)
- Shadow in the Clouds (History of Airships) (BBC TV)
- The Italia Tragedy (BBC TV)
- Balloon Over the Alps (BBC TV)
- Three Men in a Balloon (BBC TV)
- The Great Balloon Race (BBC TV)
- The Under London Expedition (BBC TV)
- The Black Safari (BBC TV)
- The Last Great Journey on Earth (from the Amazon to the Caribbean by hovercraft on inland waterways) (BBC TV)
- 50 Years of the RAF (BBC TV)
- Gavin Maxwell (BBC Scotland)
- Socotra Revisited (comprehensive Hi-8 coverage of Socotra nearly 40 years after Botting's first film report on this island, Mosaic Pictures, London)
- Sex Appeal (TV documentary series, with Kate Botting)

Other projects include:

- The Fateful Impact (6-part animation series on the history of environmental change and conservation around the world, with Mosaic Pictures)
- Toto the Otter (children's TV animation series, with Mosaic Pictures)
