= Air Mail from Cyprus =

Air Mail from Cyprus is a 1958 British TV play. It was written by Willis Hall and is set against the backdrop of the Cyprus Emergency, focusing on the family of a soldier killed in the conflict.
