= Incident at Echo Six =

Television episode

- Written by: Troy Kennedy Martin
- Starring: Barry Foster; Tony Garnett

Original release
- Release: 9 December 1958

Incident at Echo Six is a 1958 British TV play set during the Cyprus Emergency (1955-1959). It starred Barry Foster and Tony Garnett. It was the TV debut of writer Troy Kennedy Martin who had done his national service in Cyprus. It led to Martin joining the BBC script department. According to the TV Brain website, the play no longer exists in the archives.
