= Ian Sayer =

British historian

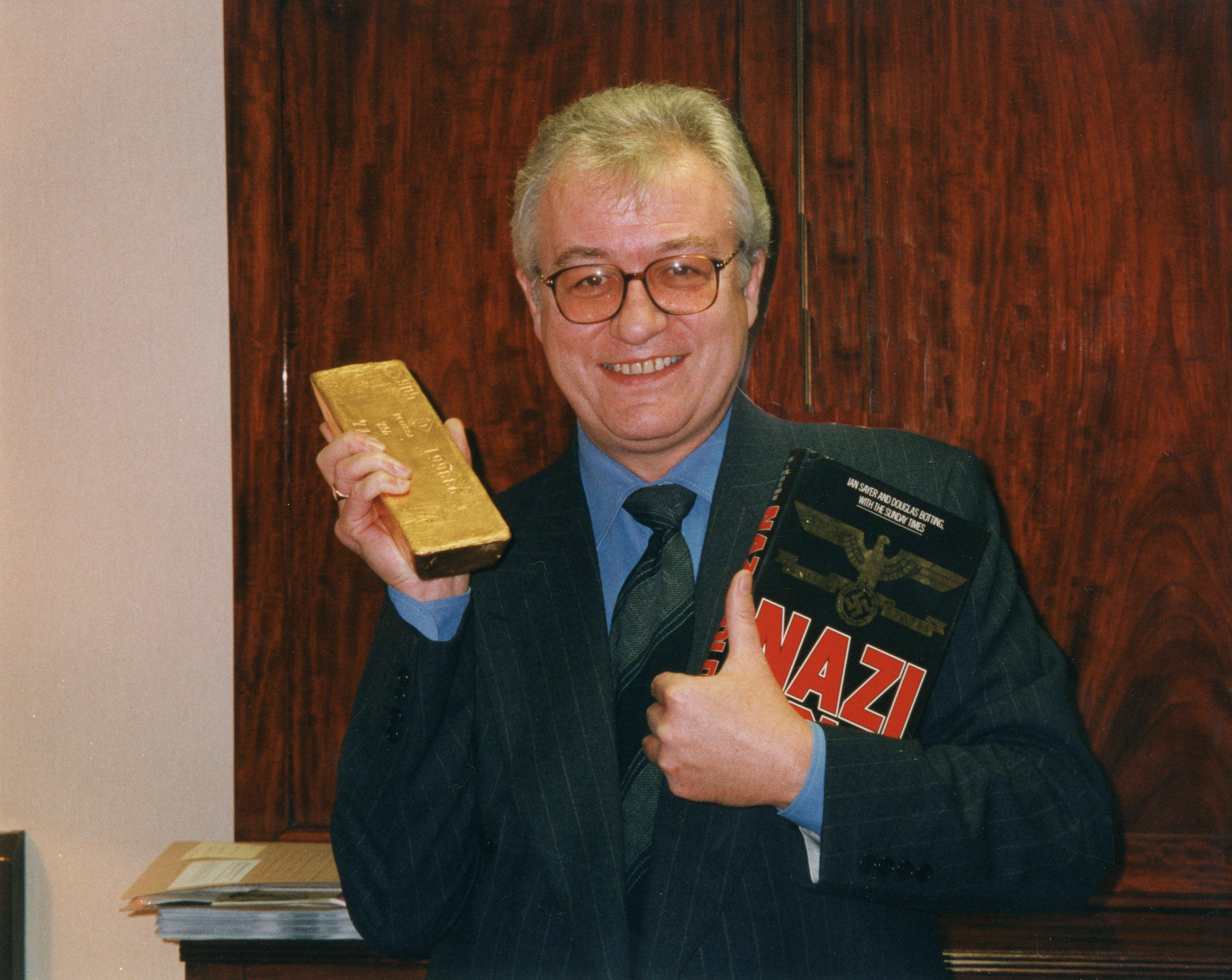
Ian Sayer at the Bank of England in 1997

Ian K. T. Sayer (born 30 October 1945) is a British entrepreneur, World War II historian, author and investigative journalist. His Sayer Transport Group (established in 1967 and sold in 1979) became part of the British and European overnight door to door express parcels delivery industry.

He is a World War II historian and studies Nazi Germany documentation. He is co-author of Nazi Gold, The Story of the World’s Greatest Robbery and claims to remain the only private individual to have been responsible for the location and restitution of looted Nazi gold. That claim remains unchallenged. As a Nazi hunter, he has also tracked down a number of Nazis for war criminal investigations, including SS General Wilhelm Mohnke whose wartime activities were subsequently investigated by the British, Canadian, American and German governments.

He currently acts as curator to the "Ian Sayer Archive", a collection of contemporary World War II documentation, which assists in providing information to institutions, other historians, authors and researchers of the period.

== Education and early career ==
Ian Sayer was born in Norwich, Norfolk, two months after the end of World War II. His father, Leslie, had found it difficult to find work (as a commercial artist) in the 1930s and moved to West London to secure employment shortly before the war. Ian and his two older brothers were brought up in Feltham, Middlesex. He was educated at Sunbury Grammar School where he obtained General Certificates of Education in English Economic History and English.

During the 1950s he became an avid "spotter" recording the registration marks of everything from steam locomotives, warships, buses and finally aeroplanes. It was this last interest which led to the 15-year-old Sayer's first commercial venture – the purchase and sale of old aircraft magazines and books.

Entering the insurance industry in the City of London as a junior clerk in 1962 he changed jobs several times before deciding to work closer to home. In 1965 he became a junior export clerk in an air freight company at London's Heathrow Airport.

== Transport career ==
In 1966 he and a partner established a small transport company delivering airfreight to and from Heathrow Airport. The partnership ended in 1967 and the 21-year-old Sayer decided to "go it alone" with one van.

The company expanded and then, in December 1969, as a result of a strike at Heathrow began the first daily, door to door, overnight parcels delivery service between London and Northern Ireland. This operation, initially competing against air freight services, was to revolutionise road transport in Britain and Europe. In the ensuing decade the company's activities expanded to encompass overnight services between the whole of mainland Britain and the major offshore islands.

By 1979 the company was one of the most successful transport companies in the United Kingdom. The overnight door to door concept had already been firmly established in the United States (by FedEx) and Australia (by transport conglomerates TNT and Ipec.

Sayer had already rejected a number of overtures from Sir Peter Abeles' TNT Group who wished to acquire his company to spearhead their proposed entry into the British and European markets but Gordon Barton's Ipec Group were also interested in penetrating this market and, following an approach from deputy chairman Hugh O’Neill (now 3rd Baron Rathcavan) and his assistant Mark Thatcher (later seconded as Sayer's personal assistant), in the spring of 1979, he agreed to act as a consultant. This subsequently led to Ipec's simultaneous acquisition of the Sayer Transport Group and Gelders-Spetra (a Dutch-based European haulage company) The combined group was renamed Ipec Europe B V which became the first company to establish an overnight door to door intra-European delivery service.

Although Sayer remained on the board of Ipec's European holding company until its takeover by TNT in 1983 he now had more time to pursue his other interests.

== Author ==
During the 1950s Sayer had developed a considerable interest in World War II. He had been brought up in an era where there had been a proliferation of films and books concerning the conflict. In addition his awareness of military history had been heightened by the fact that his great grandmother had been awarded a special scroll and £3 (a considerable amount of money in those days) by Queen Victoria to expressly commemorate the fact that his grandmother's six brothers were, in 1900, simultaneously serving under the colours in places as far afield as India and South Africa.

In 1974 Sayer had become fascinated by an entry in Guinness World Records (formerly known as The Guinness Book of Records) under the heading 'World's Greatest Robbery'. In 1945 the Nazi regime sent its remaining gold and currency reserves to Bavaria where it was hidden in the mountains. With the war over, the US military and the US occupation authorities began to try and recover this buried loot. However, a considerable amount of the treasure had, in the meantime, simply disappeared, spirited away by a loose consortium of former Nazi and SS officers with the assistance of serving US military personnel. Despite a series of high level investigations by US military and civilian agencies much of it was never recovered. Following a U.S. "Watergate" style cover up in the late 1940s and a subsequent investigation by the German police the case was never solved.

Sayer became so intrigued with the story that, 30 years later, he decided to launch his own private investigation. From 1975 to 1983 he travelled to many countries, conducted hundreds of interviews and also received a series of threats from individuals who had been implicated in the disappearance of the treasure but wished to retain their privacy. One of these threats manifested itself in Sayer being implicated in the 1980 disappearance of Jeanette May the former wife of Evelyn Robert de Rothschild in Italy. The bodies of Jeanette May and her friend Gabriella Guerin were subsequently located in 1982 but although Sayer was able to establish that he had no involvement whatsoever in the case he was interviewed by the Italian police and Scotland Yard on several occasions.

Despite having alerted the United States Department of State (responsible for the missing bullion) to his findings in 1978 it was to be another five years before they launched an official investigation. It lasted from 1983 to 1996 and culminated in the recovery of 25 kilos of stolen gold bullion still bearing full Nazi hallmarks. The results of his investigation were published in the 1984 international best seller Nazi Gold – the Story of the World’s Greatest Robbery (co-author Douglas Botting with the London Sunday Times).

In December 1997 he was the sole unofficial British observer at the London Conference on Nazi gold, an international symposium convened in London by the Foreign & Commonwealth Office and attended by delegates from 42 countries.

== Hunting Nazi war criminals ==
In 1984 Sayer approached Jeff Rooker, MP for Perry Barr to ask a Parliamentary Question on when Britain would be releasing several tonnes of looted Nazi gold still held in the Bank of England pending the resolution of a 1946 reparations claim against Albania in respect of the Corfu Channel Incident. Despite various Parliamentary Questions, an adjournment debate on the issue, and a direct request to the Prime Minister for clarification the matter was not finally resolved until 1996.

In 1988 Sayer was asked by Jeff Rooker to investigate a claim by one of his constituents that a regimental aid fund, established in World War II, was not benefitting the former POWs it had been established to care for. Sayers' subsequent enquiries established that Rooker's constituent had been a survivor of the Wormhoudt massacre, the murder of nearly 90 unarmed British and French troops in 1940 by members of the Infantry Regiment Leibstandarte SS Adolf Hitler, during the retreat to Dunkirk. Rooker's file contained a picture of the SS officer, allegedly responsible for the crime, who had disappeared at the end of the war. Sayer recognised the officer as SS General Wilhelm Mohnke who had been responsible for the defence of the underground bunker complex in which Adolf Hitler committed suicide. Sayer's subsequent investigation linked Mohnke with other World War II atrocities including the murder of unarmed Canadian soldiers taken prisoner during the Normandy invasion and the infamous Malmedy massacre of unarmed US prisoners of war during the Battle of the Bulge.

Sayer had come across Wilhelm Mohnke in the late 1970s whilst conducting research for his book "Nazi Gold", but had been unaware of his alleged involvement in war crimes. Sayer traced Mohnke to his home town of Barsbüttel near Hamburg and Rooker was able to highlight Mohnke's location and his involvement in the Wormhoudt massacre in the House of Commons on 21 April 1988. This action led to international media interest, which had the effect of keeping Mohnke homebound. Although the British, Canadian and US governments all became involved – German legislation dictated that any investigation should be conducted by Mohnke's local judicial authority. Sayer arranged for Rooker's constituent to initiate a formal complaint, which obliged the reluctant State Prosecutor in Lubeck to launch an investigation. This investigation lasted for nearly six years with the State Prosecutor concluding that there was insufficient evidence to charge Mohnke. Wilhelm Mohnke was not interviewed at any time during the investigation.

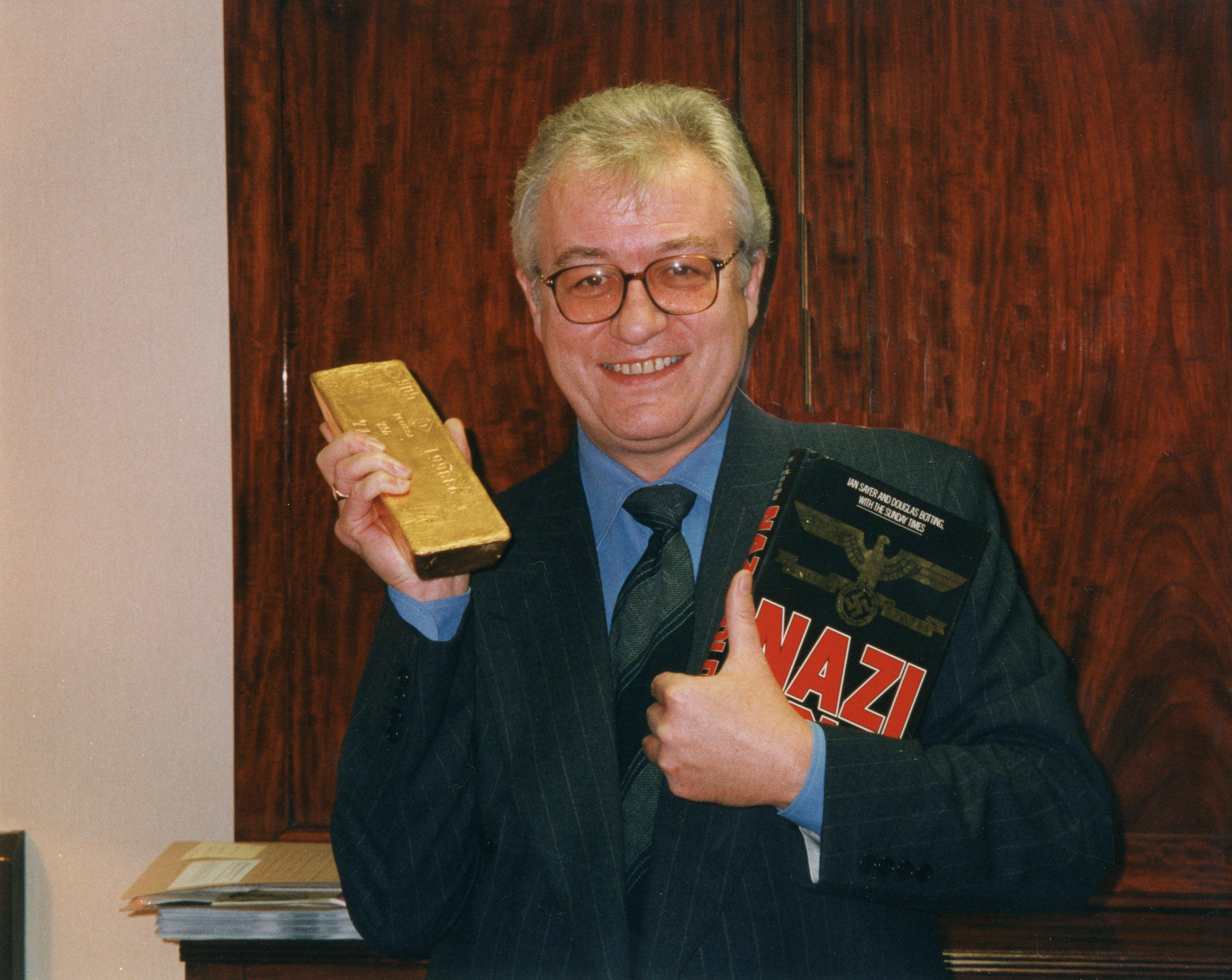
Ian Sayer at the Bank of England holding the bar of Nazi Gold bearing a swastika mark, which is held in the bank's vault

== Other activities ==
In December 1969 he was one of 25 finalists in the London Evening News 'Personality of the Year' awards together with Formula 1 motor racing champion Graham Hill, film star Ben Lyon and English test cricketer and later Bishop of Liverpool David Sheppard.

In the late 1970s, whilst researching "Nazi Gold" Sayer developed an interest in collecting historical autographs and manuscripts. Initially his collection was general in nature but over the years he began to specialise in aviation and World War II material. In 1980 he opened Britain's first Autograph Shop, selling framed items, at Sunningdale, Berkshire.

In 1983 he was able to assist the Sunday Times, during their publication of the hoax Hitler Diaries, by providing information which, although casting increasing doubt over the authenticity of the "Diaries", allowed them to begin the process of retraction.

Sayer remained active in the express parcels industry during the 1980s and 1990s initially acting in a consultative capacity on behalf of companies such as British Airways, KLM and DHL Express. He was DHL's European Consultant between 1984 and 1985 and played a major role in the establishment of its original Brussels Transport Hub and highly successful Intra European parcels delivery system.

In 1985 he was appointed to the board of British parcels carrier City Link Ltd playing a leading role in updating and modernising the company's activities and facilities. In 1988 he was appointed to the board of government owned Belfast International Airport serving two terms of three years until privatisation in 1994.

On 27 September 1990 he was one of 100 delegates attending an Anti-Terrorist conference at the Royal Over-Seas League just off St. James's Street in London's West End, who narrowly escaped death from a bomb which had been placed in the conference room by the Provisional Irish Republican Army.

In 1988 he founded and published the nationally distributed magazine World War II Investigator which he sold the following year.

== The Ian Sayer Archive ==
During the 1990s Sayer continued to build, evaluate and catalogue his 25,000 volume library and World War II document collection. Generally accepted as one of the world's leading experts on Third Reich documentation and signature identification, he now acts as curator of the Ian Sayer Archive, making its contents available to institutions including the Imperial War Museum, other historians, authors and professional researchers of the period. The archive in 2009 made a significant contribution to Andrew Roberts’ book, the bestselling The Storm of War: a New History of the Second World War (2009), Allen Lane, ISBN 0-7139-9970-5

== Current activities ==
He is currently a consultant to Europe's leading specialist autograph auction house, International Autograph Auctions Ltd, the British-based company he helped to establish, with autograph expert Richard Davie, in 2005.

== Bibliography ==
- Nazi Gold: The Story of the World's Greatest Robbery - And Its Aftermath (co-author Douglas Botting with the London Sunday Times); Granada, 1984; ISBN 0-246-11767-2
- America's Secret Army: The Untold Story of the Counter Intelligence Corps (co-author Douglas Botting); Grafton Books, 1989; ISBN 0-246-12690-6
- Hitler's Last General: The Case Against Wilhelm Mohnke (co-author Douglas Botting); Bantam Books, 1989; ISBN 0-593-01709-9
- Hitler's Bastard: Through Hell and Back in Nazi Germany and Stalin's Russia (by Eric Pleasants : Edited by Ian Sayer and Douglas Botting) : Mainstream Publishing, 2003; ISBN 1-84018-743-3
- Hitler and Women: The Love Life of Adolf Hitler (co- author Douglas Botting) Constable and Robinson, 2004; ISBN 1-84119-918-4
- Opinion – The Hunt - Al Jazeera on Line Edition. 5 December 2013

== Filmography ==
Mystery of the Reichsbank Gold - ZDF Enterprises - 2001

Secrets of the Third Reich – Nazi Gold – Flashback Films - 2003 (Screened Channel 4 31 March 2003

Secrets of the Third Reich – Nazi Gold - ZDF Enterprises -2012
